

11001–11100 

|-bgcolor=#fefefe
| 11001 Andrewulff || 1979 MF ||  || June 16, 1979 || La Silla || H.-E. Schuster || — || align=right | 3.8 km || 
|-id=002 bgcolor=#d6d6d6
| 11002 Richardlis ||  ||  || June 24, 1979 || Siding Spring || E. F. Helin, S. J. Bus || EOS || align=right | 9.8 km || 
|-id=003 bgcolor=#E9E9E9
| 11003 Andronov ||  ||  || October 14, 1979 || Nauchnij || N. S. Chernykh || — || align=right | 4.2 km || 
|-id=004 bgcolor=#d6d6d6
| 11004 Stenmark ||  ||  || March 16, 1980 || La Silla || C.-I. Lagerkvist || — || align=right | 23 km || 
|-id=005 bgcolor=#E9E9E9
| 11005 Waldtrudering ||  ||  || August 6, 1980 || La Silla || R. M. West || — || align=right | 8.4 km || 
|-id=006 bgcolor=#fefefe
| 11006 Gilson ||  ||  || October 9, 1980 || Palomar || C. S. Shoemaker, E. M. Shoemaker || — || align=right | 3.9 km || 
|-id=007 bgcolor=#fefefe
| 11007 Granahan ||  ||  || November 1, 1980 || Palomar || S. J. Bus || — || align=right | 3.6 km || 
|-id=008 bgcolor=#E9E9E9
| 11008 Ernst ||  ||  || March 1, 1981 || Siding Spring || S. J. Bus || — || align=right | 5.0 km || 
|-id=009 bgcolor=#E9E9E9
| 11009 Sigridclose ||  ||  || March 1, 1981 || Siding Spring || S. J. Bus || EUN || align=right | 5.3 km || 
|-id=010 bgcolor=#fefefe
| 11010 Artemieva ||  ||  || March 2, 1981 || Siding Spring || S. J. Bus || V || align=right | 2.3 km || 
|-id=011 bgcolor=#fefefe
| 11011 KIAM ||  ||  || October 22, 1981 || Nauchnij || N. S. Chernykh || NYS || align=right | 4.6 km || 
|-id=012 bgcolor=#E9E9E9
| 11012 Henning ||  ||  || May 15, 1982 || Palomar || Palomar Obs. || — || align=right | 8.0 km || 
|-id=013 bgcolor=#fefefe
| 11013 Kullander ||  ||  || August 16, 1982 || La Silla || C.-I. Lagerkvist || NYS || align=right | 3.1 km || 
|-id=014 bgcolor=#E9E9E9
| 11014 Svätopluk ||  ||  || August 23, 1982 || Piszkéstető || M. Antal || — || align=right | 14 km || 
|-id=015 bgcolor=#E9E9E9
| 11015 Romanenko ||  ||  || September 17, 1982 || Nauchnij || N. S. Chernykh || — || align=right | 5.2 km || 
|-id=016 bgcolor=#fefefe
| 11016 Borisov ||  ||  || September 16, 1982 || Nauchnij || L. I. Chernykh || — || align=right | 3.0 km || 
|-id=017 bgcolor=#E9E9E9
| 11017 Billputnam || 1983 BD ||  || January 16, 1983 || Anderson Mesa || E. Bowell || — || align=right | 12 km || 
|-id=018 bgcolor=#fefefe
| 11018 ||  || — || February 15, 1983 || Anderson Mesa || N. G. Thomas || — || align=right | 5.0 km || 
|-id=019 bgcolor=#fefefe
| 11019 Hansrott || 1984 HR ||  || April 25, 1984 || Kleť || A. Mrkos || NYS || align=right | 3.9 km || 
|-id=020 bgcolor=#d6d6d6
| 11020 Orwell || 1984 OG ||  || July 31, 1984 || Kleť || A. Mrkos || — || align=right | 14 km || 
|-id=021 bgcolor=#d6d6d6
| 11021 Foderà ||  ||  || January 12, 1986 || Anderson Mesa || E. Bowell || — || align=right | 18 km || 
|-id=022 bgcolor=#E9E9E9
| 11022 Serio ||  ||  || March 5, 1986 || Anderson Mesa || E. Bowell || — || align=right | 8.9 km || 
|-id=023 bgcolor=#fefefe
| 11023 || 1986 QZ || — || August 26, 1986 || La Silla || H. Debehogne || FLO || align=right | 3.7 km || 
|-id=024 bgcolor=#E9E9E9
| 11024 ||  || — || August 26, 1986 || La Silla || H. Debehogne || — || align=right | 10 km || 
|-id=025 bgcolor=#E9E9E9
| 11025 ||  || — || August 27, 1986 || La Silla || H. Debehogne || ADE || align=right | 7.6 km || 
|-id=026 bgcolor=#fefefe
| 11026 Greatbotkin ||  ||  || September 2, 1986 || Kleť || A. Mrkos || — || align=right | 3.4 km || 
|-id=027 bgcolor=#fefefe
| 11027 Astafʹev ||  ||  || September 7, 1986 || Nauchnij || L. I. Chernykh || — || align=right | 2.8 km || 
|-id=028 bgcolor=#E9E9E9
| 11028 || 1987 UW || — || October 18, 1987 || Palomar || J. E. Mueller || BAR || align=right | 4.4 km || 
|-id=029 bgcolor=#d6d6d6
| 11029 || 1988 GZ || — || April 9, 1988 || Brorfelde || P. Jensen || HYG || align=right | 16 km || 
|-id=030 bgcolor=#fefefe
| 11030 || 1988 PK || — || August 13, 1988 || Siding Spring || R. H. McNaught || — || align=right | 2.4 km || 
|-id=031 bgcolor=#fefefe
| 11031 ||  || — || September 2, 1988 || La Silla || H. Debehogne || — || align=right | 3.6 km || 
|-id=032 bgcolor=#fefefe
| 11032 ||  || — || September 2, 1988 || La Silla || H. Debehogne || NYS || align=right | 3.5 km || 
|-id=033 bgcolor=#E9E9E9
| 11033 Mazanek ||  ||  || September 16, 1988 || Cerro Tololo || S. J. Bus || — || align=right | 3.5 km || 
|-id=034 bgcolor=#fefefe
| 11034 || 1988 TG || — || October 9, 1988 || Gekko || Y. Oshima || — || align=right | 3.1 km || 
|-id=035 bgcolor=#E9E9E9
| 11035 ||  || — || November 12, 1988 || Gekko || Y. Oshima || EUN || align=right | 5.8 km || 
|-id=036 bgcolor=#E9E9E9
| 11036 ||  || — || January 4, 1989 || Siding Spring || R. H. McNaught || — || align=right | 3.8 km || 
|-id=037 bgcolor=#d6d6d6
| 11037 Distler ||  ||  || February 2, 1989 || Tautenburg Observatory || F. Börngen || KOR || align=right | 5.2 km || 
|-id=038 bgcolor=#fefefe
| 11038 ||  || — || March 8, 1989 || Yorii || M. Arai, H. Mori || — || align=right | 4.5 km || 
|-id=039 bgcolor=#d6d6d6
| 11039 Raynal ||  ||  || April 3, 1989 || La Silla || E. W. Elst || — || align=right | 5.7 km || 
|-id=040 bgcolor=#fefefe
| 11040 Wundt ||  ||  || September 3, 1989 || Haute-Provence || E. W. Elst || — || align=right | 2.3 km || 
|-id=041 bgcolor=#fefefe
| 11041 Fechner ||  ||  || September 26, 1989 || La Silla || E. W. Elst || V || align=right | 2.1 km || 
|-id=042 bgcolor=#fefefe
| 11042 Ernstweber ||  ||  || November 3, 1989 || La Silla || E. W. Elst || V || align=right | 2.7 km || 
|-id=043 bgcolor=#fefefe
| 11043 Pepping ||  ||  || December 25, 1989 || Tautenburg Observatory || F. Börngen || — || align=right | 3.4 km || 
|-id=044 bgcolor=#E9E9E9
| 11044 || 1990 DV || — || February 28, 1990 || Kushiro || S. Ueda, H. Kaneda || CLO || align=right | 10 km || 
|-id=045 bgcolor=#E9E9E9
| 11045 ||  || — || April 26, 1990 || Palomar || E. F. Helin || EUN || align=right | 4.9 km || 
|-id=046 bgcolor=#E9E9E9
| 11046 ||  || — || July 30, 1990 || Palomar || H. E. Holt || CLO || align=right | 5.2 km || 
|-id=047 bgcolor=#d6d6d6
| 11047 ||  || — || August 22, 1990 || Palomar || H. E. Holt || — || align=right | 8.4 km || 
|-id=048 bgcolor=#d6d6d6
| 11048 ||  || — || August 29, 1990 || Palomar || H. E. Holt || — || align=right | 15 km || 
|-id=049 bgcolor=#fefefe
| 11049 ||  || — || September 14, 1990 || Palomar || H. E. Holt || — || align=right | 4.7 km || 
|-id=050 bgcolor=#d6d6d6
| 11050 Messiaën ||  ||  || October 13, 1990 || Tautenburg Observatory || F. Börngen, L. D. Schmadel || EOS || align=right | 6.1 km || 
|-id=051 bgcolor=#d6d6d6
| 11051 Racine ||  ||  || November 15, 1990 || La Silla || E. W. Elst || — || align=right | 7.1 km || 
|-id=052 bgcolor=#d6d6d6
| 11052 || 1990 WM || — || November 20, 1990 || Siding Spring || R. H. McNaught || — || align=right | 11 km || 
|-id=053 bgcolor=#d6d6d6
| 11053 ||  || — || February 3, 1991 || Kushiro || S. Ueda, H. Kaneda || KOR || align=right | 8.8 km || 
|-id=054 bgcolor=#FFC2E0
| 11054 || 1991 FA || — || March 17, 1991 || Kitt Peak || Spacewatch || AMO +1km || align=right | 1.5 km || 
|-id=055 bgcolor=#fefefe
| 11055 Honduras ||  ||  || April 8, 1991 || La Silla || E. W. Elst || — || align=right | 8.4 km || 
|-id=056 bgcolor=#fefefe
| 11056 Volland ||  ||  || June 6, 1991 || La Silla || E. W. Elst || V || align=right | 9.0 km || 
|-id=057 bgcolor=#E9E9E9
| 11057 || 1991 NL || — || July 8, 1991 || Palomar || E. F. Helin || — || align=right | 5.4 km || 
|-id=058 bgcolor=#fefefe
| 11058 ||  || — || August 7, 1991 || Palomar || H. E. Holt || H || align=right | 1.9 km || 
|-id=059 bgcolor=#E9E9E9
| 11059 Nulliusinverba || 1991 RS ||  || September 4, 1991 || Palomar || E. F. Helin || — || align=right | 4.9 km || 
|-id=060 bgcolor=#E9E9E9
| 11060 ||  || — || September 10, 1991 || Palomar || H. E. Holt || — || align=right | 9.2 km || 
|-id=061 bgcolor=#E9E9E9
| 11061 Lagerlöf ||  ||  || September 10, 1991 || Tautenburg Observatory || F. Börngen || HEN || align=right | 4.9 km || 
|-id=062 bgcolor=#d6d6d6
| 11062 || 1991 SN || — || September 30, 1991 || Siding Spring || R. H. McNaught || EOS || align=right | 9.6 km || 
|-id=063 bgcolor=#E9E9E9
| 11063 Poynting ||  ||  || November 2, 1991 || La Silla || E. W. Elst || — || align=right | 12 km || 
|-id=064 bgcolor=#E9E9E9
| 11064 Dogen || 1991 WB ||  || November 30, 1991 || Kagoshima || M. Mukai, M. Takeishi || PAL || align=right | 9.0 km || 
|-id=065 bgcolor=#E9E9E9
| 11065 ||  || — || December 1, 1991 || Palomar || H. E. Holt || GEF || align=right | 12 km || 
|-id=066 bgcolor=#FFC2E0
| 11066 Sigurd ||  ||  || February 9, 1992 || Palomar || C. S. Shoemaker, E. M. Shoemaker || APO +1km || align=right | 2.1 km || 
|-id=067 bgcolor=#d6d6d6
| 11067 Greenancy ||  ||  || February 25, 1992 || Kitt Peak || Spacewatch || — || align=right | 6.3 km || 
|-id=068 bgcolor=#fefefe
| 11068 || 1992 EA || — || March 2, 1992 || Kushiro || S. Ueda, H. Kaneda || — || align=right | 4.1 km || 
|-id=069 bgcolor=#d6d6d6
| 11069 Bellqvist ||  ||  || March 1, 1992 || La Silla || UESAC || — || align=right | 9.1 km || 
|-id=070 bgcolor=#d6d6d6
| 11070 ||  || — || March 2, 1992 || La Silla || UESAC || — || align=right | 9.6 km || 
|-id=071 bgcolor=#d6d6d6
| 11071 ||  || — || March 1, 1992 || La Silla || UESAC || HYG || align=right | 10 km || 
|-id=072 bgcolor=#fefefe
| 11072 Hiraoka || 1992 GP ||  || April 3, 1992 || Kitami || K. Endate, K. Watanabe || — || align=right | 8.7 km || 
|-id=073 bgcolor=#fefefe
| 11073 Cavell ||  ||  || September 2, 1992 || La Silla || E. W. Elst || NYS || align=right | 3.0 km || 
|-id=074 bgcolor=#E9E9E9
| 11074 Kuniwake ||  ||  || September 23, 1992 || Kitami || K. Endate, K. Watanabe || — || align=right | 4.3 km || 
|-id=075 bgcolor=#fefefe
| 11075 Dönhoff ||  ||  || September 23, 1992 || Tautenburg Observatory || F. Börngen || NYS || align=right | 7.8 km || 
|-id=076 bgcolor=#fefefe
| 11076 || 1992 UR || — || October 21, 1992 || Kiyosato || S. Otomo || — || align=right | 6.7 km || 
|-id=077 bgcolor=#E9E9E9
| 11077 ||  || — || November 18, 1992 || Kushiro || S. Ueda, H. Kaneda || — || align=right | 6.1 km || 
|-id=078 bgcolor=#d6d6d6
| 11078 ||  || — || November 18, 1992 || Kushiro || S. Ueda, H. Kaneda || JLI || align=right | 11 km || 
|-id=079 bgcolor=#E9E9E9
| 11079 Mitsunori || 1993 AJ ||  || January 13, 1993 || Kitami || K. Endate, K. Watanabe || — || align=right | 6.9 km || 
|-id=080 bgcolor=#d6d6d6
| 11080 || 1993 FO || — || March 23, 1993 || Lake Tekapo || A. C. Gilmore, P. M. Kilmartin || — || align=right | 9.5 km || 
|-id=081 bgcolor=#d6d6d6
| 11081 Persäve ||  ||  || March 21, 1993 || La Silla || UESAC || — || align=right | 11 km || 
|-id=082 bgcolor=#d6d6d6
| 11082 Spilliaert || 1993 JW ||  || May 14, 1993 || La Silla || E. W. Elst || — || align=right | 15 km || 
|-id=083 bgcolor=#fefefe
| 11083 Caracas ||  ||  || September 15, 1993 || La Silla || E. W. Elst || — || align=right | 3.7 km || 
|-id=084 bgcolor=#fefefe
| 11084 Giò ||  ||  || September 19, 1993 || Farra d'Isonzo || Farra d'Isonzo || — || align=right | 2.5 km || 
|-id=085 bgcolor=#fefefe
| 11085 Isala ||  ||  || September 17, 1993 || La Silla || E. W. Elst || NYS || align=right | 3.8 km || 
|-id=086 bgcolor=#fefefe
| 11086 Nagatayuji ||  ||  || October 11, 1993 || Kitami || K. Endate, K. Watanabe || FLO || align=right | 5.9 km || 
|-id=087 bgcolor=#fefefe
| 11087 Yamasakimakoto ||  ||  || October 15, 1993 || Kitami || K. Endate, K. Watanabe || — || align=right | 4.2 km || 
|-id=088 bgcolor=#fefefe
| 11088 || 1993 UN || — || October 19, 1993 || Nachi-Katsuura || Y. Shimizu, T. Urata || — || align=right | 3.0 km || 
|-id=089 bgcolor=#C2FFFF
| 11089 ||  || — || February 8, 1994 || Mérida || O. A. Naranjo || L5 || align=right | 37 km || 
|-id=090 bgcolor=#E9E9E9
| 11090 Popelin ||  ||  || February 7, 1994 || La Silla || E. W. Elst || — || align=right | 5.1 km || 
|-id=091 bgcolor=#fefefe
| 11091 Thelonious || 1994 DP ||  || February 16, 1994 || Kitt Peak || Spacewatch || — || align=right | 8.2 km || 
|-id=092 bgcolor=#E9E9E9
| 11092 Iwakisan || 1994 ED ||  || March 4, 1994 || Ōizumi || T. Kobayashi || — || align=right | 7.0 km || 
|-id=093 bgcolor=#E9E9E9
| 11093 || 1994 HD || — || April 17, 1994 || Siding Spring || R. H. McNaught || — || align=right | 9.1 km || 
|-id=094 bgcolor=#d6d6d6
| 11094 Cuba ||  ||  || August 10, 1994 || La Silla || E. W. Elst || — || align=right | 9.9 km || 
|-id=095 bgcolor=#d6d6d6
| 11095 Havana ||  ||  || August 12, 1994 || La Silla || E. W. Elst || — || align=right | 10 km || 
|-id=096 bgcolor=#d6d6d6
| 11096 ||  || — || September 1, 1994 || Palomar || E. F. Helin || — || align=right | 12 km || 
|-id=097 bgcolor=#d6d6d6
| 11097 ||  || — || October 31, 1994 || Nachi-Katsuura || Y. Shimizu, T. Urata || 2:1J || align=right | 8.5 km || 
|-id=098 bgcolor=#E9E9E9
| 11098 Ginsberg ||  ||  || April 2, 1995 || Kitt Peak || Spacewatch || — || align=right | 11 km || 
|-id=099 bgcolor=#fefefe
| 11099 Sonodamasaki || 1995 HL ||  || April 20, 1995 || Kitami || K. Endate, K. Watanabe || KLI || align=right | 9.5 km || 
|-id=100 bgcolor=#fefefe
| 11100 Lai || 1995 KC ||  || May 22, 1995 || Bologna || San Vittore Obs. || — || align=right | 3.3 km || 
|}

11101–11200 

|-bgcolor=#E9E9E9
| 11101 Českáfilharmonie || 1995 SH ||  || September 17, 1995 || Ondřejov || L. Kotková || EUN || align=right | 5.4 km || 
|-id=102 bgcolor=#E9E9E9
| 11102 Bertorighini ||  ||  || September 26, 1995 || San Marcello || L. Tesi || — || align=right | 3.8 km || 
|-id=103 bgcolor=#d6d6d6
| 11103 Miekerouppe ||  ||  || September 18, 1995 || Kitt Peak || Spacewatch || KOR || align=right | 8.6 km || 
|-id=104 bgcolor=#d6d6d6
| 11104 Airion || 1995 TQ ||  || October 6, 1995 || AMOS || AMOS || SAN || align=right | 7.6 km || 
|-id=105 bgcolor=#E9E9E9
| 11105 Puchnarová ||  ||  || October 24, 1995 || Kleť || J. Tichá || — || align=right | 6.9 km || 
|-id=106 bgcolor=#d6d6d6
| 11106 ||  || — || October 17, 1995 || Nachi-Katsuura || Y. Shimizu, T. Urata || — || align=right | 15 km || 
|-id=107 bgcolor=#d6d6d6
| 11107 Hakkoda ||  ||  || October 25, 1995 || Ōizumi || T. Kobayashi || EOS || align=right | 8.9 km || 
|-id=108 bgcolor=#d6d6d6
| 11108 Hachimantai ||  ||  || October 27, 1995 || Ōizumi || T. Kobayashi || EOS || align=right | 7.7 km || 
|-id=109 bgcolor=#d6d6d6
| 11109 Iwatesan ||  ||  || October 27, 1995 || Ōizumi || T. Kobayashi || KOR || align=right | 6.5 km || 
|-id=110 bgcolor=#d6d6d6
| 11110 ||  || — || November 2, 1995 || Kiyosato || S. Otomo || — || align=right | 12 km || 
|-id=111 bgcolor=#d6d6d6
| 11111 Repunit || 1995 WL ||  || November 16, 1995 || Ōizumi || T. Kobayashi || KOR || align=right | 5.7 km || 
|-id=112 bgcolor=#d6d6d6
| 11112 Cagnoli ||  ||  || November 18, 1995 || Dossobuono || Madonna di Dossobuono Obs. || — || align=right | 8.8 km || 
|-id=113 bgcolor=#E9E9E9
| 11113 ||  || — || November 18, 1995 || Nachi-Katsuura || Y. Shimizu, T. Urata || WAT || align=right | 7.6 km || 
|-id=114 bgcolor=#d6d6d6
| 11114 ||  || — || November 16, 1995 || Chichibu || N. Satō, T. Urata || — || align=right | 6.1 km || 
|-id=115 bgcolor=#d6d6d6
| 11115 Kariya ||  ||  || November 21, 1995 || Kuma Kogen || A. Nakamura || HYG || align=right | 7.4 km || 
|-id=116 bgcolor=#fefefe
| 11116 || 1996 EK || — || March 10, 1996 || Kushiro || S. Ueda, H. Kaneda || — || align=right | 3.1 km || 
|-id=117 bgcolor=#fefefe
| 11117 Giuseppeolongo ||  ||  || June 14, 1996 || Farra d'Isonzo || Farra d'Isonzo || — || align=right | 2.9 km || 
|-id=118 bgcolor=#fefefe
| 11118 Modra || 1996 PK ||  || August 9, 1996 || Modra || A. Galád, D. Kalmančok || — || align=right | 7.2 km || 
|-id=119 bgcolor=#fefefe
| 11119 Taro ||  ||  || August 9, 1996 || Nanyo || T. Okuni || — || align=right | 5.6 km || 
|-id=120 bgcolor=#fefefe
| 11120 Pancaldi ||  ||  || August 17, 1996 || Bologna || San Vittore Obs. || FLO || align=right | 3.1 km || 
|-id=121 bgcolor=#fefefe
| 11121 Malpighi ||  ||  || September 10, 1996 || Pianoro || V. Goretti || — || align=right | 3.3 km || 
|-id=122 bgcolor=#fefefe
| 11122 Eliscolombini ||  ||  || September 13, 1996 || Bologna || San Vittore Obs. || NYS || align=right | 3.3 km || 
|-id=123 bgcolor=#E9E9E9
| 11123 Aliciaclaire ||  ||  || September 8, 1996 || Haleakalā || NEAT || — || align=right | 7.1 km || 
|-id=124 bgcolor=#fefefe
| 11124 Mikulášek ||  ||  || October 14, 1996 || Kleť || M. Tichý, Z. Moravec || — || align=right | 3.6 km || 
|-id=125 bgcolor=#fefefe
| 11125 ||  || — || October 9, 1996 || Kushiro || S. Ueda, H. Kaneda || FLO || align=right | 4.0 km || 
|-id=126 bgcolor=#E9E9E9
| 11126 Doleček ||  ||  || October 15, 1996 || Ondřejov || P. Pravec || — || align=right | 4.0 km || 
|-id=127 bgcolor=#fefefe
| 11127 Hagi ||  ||  || October 20, 1996 || Sendai || K. Cross || FLO || align=right | 3.6 km || 
|-id=128 bgcolor=#fefefe
| 11128 Ostravia || 1996 VP ||  || November 3, 1996 || Kleť || J. Tichá, M. Tichý || NYS || align=right | 4.0 km || 
|-id=129 bgcolor=#E9E9E9
| 11129 Hayachine ||  ||  || November 14, 1996 || Ōizumi || T. Kobayashi || MAR || align=right | 6.2 km || 
|-id=130 bgcolor=#fefefe
| 11130 ||  || — || November 7, 1996 || Kushiro || S. Ueda, H. Kaneda || — || align=right | 4.9 km || 
|-id=131 bgcolor=#fefefe
| 11131 ||  || — || November 7, 1996 || Kushiro || S. Ueda, H. Kaneda || — || align=right | 4.8 km || 
|-id=132 bgcolor=#d6d6d6
| 11132 Horne || 1996 WU ||  || November 17, 1996 || Sudbury || D. di Cicco || HYG || align=right | 13 km || 
|-id=133 bgcolor=#E9E9E9
| 11133 Kumotori || 1996 XY ||  || December 2, 1996 || Ōizumi || T. Kobayashi || — || align=right | 10 km || 
|-id=134 bgcolor=#d6d6d6
| 11134 České Budějovice ||  ||  || December 4, 1996 || Kleť || M. Tichý, Z. Moravec || KOR || align=right | 4.0 km || 
|-id=135 bgcolor=#d6d6d6
| 11135 Ryokami ||  ||  || December 3, 1996 || Ōizumi || T. Kobayashi || — || align=right | 5.4 km || 
|-id=136 bgcolor=#fefefe
| 11136 Shirleymarinus ||  ||  || December 8, 1996 || Kitt Peak || Spacewatch || V || align=right | 3.8 km || 
|-id=137 bgcolor=#d6d6d6
| 11137 Yarigatake ||  ||  || December 8, 1996 || Ōizumi || T. Kobayashi || — || align=right | 13 km || 
|-id=138 bgcolor=#E9E9E9
| 11138 Hotakadake ||  ||  || December 14, 1996 || Ōizumi || T. Kobayashi || — || align=right | 4.5 km || 
|-id=139 bgcolor=#E9E9E9
| 11139 ||  || — || December 22, 1996 || Xinglong || SCAP || — || align=right | 4.7 km || 
|-id=140 bgcolor=#d6d6d6
| 11140 Yakedake ||  ||  || January 2, 1997 || Ōizumi || T. Kobayashi || — || align=right | 15 km || 
|-id=141 bgcolor=#E9E9E9
| 11141 Jindrawalter ||  ||  || January 12, 1997 || Kleť || J. Tichá, M. Tichý || — || align=right | 4.5 km || 
|-id=142 bgcolor=#d6d6d6
| 11142 Facchini ||  ||  || January 7, 1997 || Colleverde || V. S. Casulli || EOS || align=right | 6.2 km || 
|-id=143 bgcolor=#d6d6d6
| 11143 ||  || — || January 28, 1997 || Xinglong || SCAP || — || align=right | 8.8 km || 
|-id=144 bgcolor=#d6d6d6
| 11144 Radiocommunicata ||  ||  || February 2, 1997 || Kleť || J. Tichá, M. Tichý || — || align=right | 4.6 km || 
|-id=145 bgcolor=#fefefe
| 11145 Emanuelli ||  ||  || August 29, 1997 || Sormano || P. Sicoli, P. Chiavenna || FLO || align=right | 4.7 km || 
|-id=146 bgcolor=#d6d6d6
| 11146 Kirigamine ||  ||  || November 23, 1997 || Ōizumi || T. Kobayashi || KOR || align=right | 7.2 km || 
|-id=147 bgcolor=#d6d6d6
| 11147 Delmas ||  ||  || December 6, 1997 || Bédoin || P. Antonini || — || align=right | 14 km || 
|-id=148 bgcolor=#fefefe
| 11148 Einhardress ||  ||  || December 7, 1997 || Caussols || ODAS || — || align=right | 4.2 km || 
|-id=149 bgcolor=#fefefe
| 11149 Tateshina ||  ||  || December 5, 1997 || Ōizumi || T. Kobayashi || — || align=right | 3.5 km || 
|-id=150 bgcolor=#fefefe
| 11150 Bragg ||  ||  || December 21, 1997 || Woomera || F. B. Zoltowski || NYS || align=right | 3.1 km || 
|-id=151 bgcolor=#E9E9E9
| 11151 Oodaigahara ||  ||  || December 24, 1997 || Ōizumi || T. Kobayashi || EUN || align=right | 8.8 km || 
|-id=152 bgcolor=#FA8072
| 11152 Oomine ||  ||  || December 25, 1997 || Ōizumi || T. Kobayashi || — || align=right | 3.7 km || 
|-id=153 bgcolor=#E9E9E9
| 11153 ||  || — || December 25, 1997 || Gekko || T. Kagawa, T. Urata || DOR || align=right | 10 km || 
|-id=154 bgcolor=#fefefe
| 11154 Kobushi ||  ||  || December 28, 1997 || Ōizumi || T. Kobayashi || — || align=right | 5.2 km || 
|-id=155 bgcolor=#fefefe
| 11155 Kinpu ||  ||  || December 31, 1997 || Ōizumi || T. Kobayashi || FLO || align=right | 6.8 km || 
|-id=156 bgcolor=#d6d6d6
| 11156 Al-Khwarismi ||  ||  || December 31, 1997 || Prescott || P. G. Comba || KOR || align=right | 4.7 km || 
|-id=157 bgcolor=#d6d6d6
| 11157 || 1998 AJ || — || January 2, 1998 || Nachi-Katsuura || Y. Shimizu, T. Urata || — || align=right | 11 km || 
|-id=158 bgcolor=#fefefe
| 11158 Cirou ||  ||  || January 8, 1998 || Caussols || ODAS || — || align=right | 4.0 km || 
|-id=159 bgcolor=#fefefe
| 11159 Mizugaki ||  ||  || January 19, 1998 || Ōizumi || T. Kobayashi || — || align=right | 3.1 km || 
|-id=160 bgcolor=#fefefe
| 11160 ||  || — || January 24, 1998 || Haleakalā || NEAT || — || align=right | 4.7 km || 
|-id=161 bgcolor=#fefefe
| 11161 Daibosatsu ||  ||  || January 25, 1998 || Ōizumi || T. Kobayashi || — || align=right | 3.5 km || 
|-id=162 bgcolor=#E9E9E9
| 11162 ||  || — || January 25, 1998 || Ōizumi || T. Kobayashi || — || align=right | 4.9 km || 
|-id=163 bgcolor=#d6d6d6
| 11163 Milešovka || 1998 CR ||  || February 4, 1998 || Kleť || Z. Moravec || — || align=right | 9.6 km || 
|-id=164 bgcolor=#E9E9E9
| 11164 ||  || — || February 17, 1998 || Xinglong || SCAP || HOF || align=right | 10 km || 
|-id=165 bgcolor=#E9E9E9
| 11165 ||  || — || February 22, 1998 || Haleakalā || NEAT || — || align=right | 6.1 km || 
|-id=166 bgcolor=#fefefe
| 11166 Anatolefrance ||  ||  || February 27, 1998 || La Silla || E. W. Elst || — || align=right | 6.9 km || 
|-id=167 bgcolor=#fefefe
| 11167 Kunžak ||  ||  || March 23, 1998 || Ondřejov || P. Pravec || FLO || align=right | 2.6 km || 
|-id=168 bgcolor=#fefefe
| 11168 ||  || — || March 21, 1998 || Kushiro || S. Ueda, H. Kaneda || NYS || align=right | 3.8 km || 
|-id=169 bgcolor=#fefefe
| 11169 Alkon ||  ||  || March 20, 1998 || Socorro || LINEAR || — || align=right | 4.2 km || 
|-id=170 bgcolor=#d6d6d6
| 11170 ||  || — || March 20, 1998 || Socorro || LINEAR || KOR || align=right | 5.0 km || 
|-id=171 bgcolor=#E9E9E9
| 11171 ||  || — || March 20, 1998 || Socorro || LINEAR || — || align=right | 6.8 km || 
|-id=172 bgcolor=#E9E9E9
| 11172 ||  || — || March 20, 1998 || Socorro || LINEAR || — || align=right | 5.7 km || 
|-id=173 bgcolor=#fefefe
| 11173 Jayanderson ||  ||  || March 20, 1998 || Socorro || LINEAR || — || align=right | 6.5 km || 
|-id=174 bgcolor=#fefefe
| 11174 Carandrews ||  ||  || March 20, 1998 || Socorro || LINEAR || — || align=right | 3.4 km || 
|-id=175 bgcolor=#d6d6d6
| 11175 ||  || — || March 20, 1998 || Socorro || LINEAR || HIL3:2 || align=right | 16 km || 
|-id=176 bgcolor=#d6d6d6
| 11176 Batth ||  ||  || March 20, 1998 || Socorro || LINEAR || — || align=right | 7.4 km || 
|-id=177 bgcolor=#d6d6d6
| 11177 ||  || — || March 24, 1998 || Socorro || LINEAR || — || align=right | 9.6 km || 
|-id=178 bgcolor=#E9E9E9
| 11178 ||  || — || March 31, 1998 || Socorro || LINEAR || — || align=right | 7.0 km || 
|-id=179 bgcolor=#E9E9E9
| 11179 ||  || — || March 31, 1998 || Socorro || LINEAR || — || align=right | 4.8 km || 
|-id=180 bgcolor=#E9E9E9
| 11180 ||  || — || March 31, 1998 || Socorro || LINEAR || PAD || align=right | 9.7 km || 
|-id=181 bgcolor=#d6d6d6
| 11181 ||  || — || March 31, 1998 || Socorro || LINEAR || — || align=right | 16 km || 
|-id=182 bgcolor=#E9E9E9
| 11182 ||  || — || April 2, 1998 || Socorro || LINEAR || — || align=right | 12 km || 
|-id=183 bgcolor=#E9E9E9
| 11183 ||  || — || April 2, 1998 || Socorro || LINEAR || — || align=right | 11 km || 
|-id=184 bgcolor=#d6d6d6
| 11184 Postma ||  ||  || April 18, 1998 || Kitt Peak || Spacewatch || — || align=right | 15 km || 
|-id=185 bgcolor=#d6d6d6
| 11185 ||  || — || April 21, 1998 || Socorro || LINEAR || — || align=right | 9.8 km || 
|-id=186 bgcolor=#E9E9E9
| 11186 ||  || — || April 23, 1998 || Socorro || LINEAR || EUN || align=right | 5.5 km || 
|-id=187 bgcolor=#E9E9E9
| 11187 Richoliver ||  ||  || May 22, 1998 || Anderson Mesa || LONEOS || — || align=right | 3.9 km || 
|-id=188 bgcolor=#d6d6d6
| 11188 ||  || — || May 23, 1998 || Socorro || LINEAR || 7:4 || align=right | 16 km || 
|-id=189 bgcolor=#fefefe
| 11189 Rabeaton ||  ||  || August 17, 1998 || Socorro || LINEAR || V || align=right | 3.2 km || 
|-id=190 bgcolor=#fefefe
| 11190 Jennibell ||  ||  || September 14, 1998 || Socorro || LINEAR || — || align=right | 2.5 km || 
|-id=191 bgcolor=#d6d6d6
| 11191 Paskvić ||  ||  || December 15, 1998 || Višnjan Observatory || K. Korlević || — || align=right | 7.8 km || 
|-id=192 bgcolor=#E9E9E9
| 11192 ||  || — || December 14, 1998 || Socorro || LINEAR || — || align=right | 5.6 km || 
|-id=193 bgcolor=#d6d6d6
| 11193 Mérida ||  ||  || December 11, 1998 || Mérida || O. A. Naranjo || THM || align=right | 13 km || 
|-id=194 bgcolor=#fefefe
| 11194 Mirna || 1998 YE ||  || December 16, 1998 || Višnjan Observatory || K. Korlević || — || align=right | 4.1 km || 
|-id=195 bgcolor=#fefefe
| 11195 Woomera ||  ||  || January 15, 1999 || Woomera || F. B. Zoltowski || — || align=right | 8.3 km || 
|-id=196 bgcolor=#E9E9E9
| 11196 Michanikos ||  ||  || January 22, 1999 || Reedy Creek || J. Broughton || PAD || align=right | 13 km || 
|-id=197 bgcolor=#fefefe
| 11197 Beranek ||  ||  || February 10, 1999 || Socorro || LINEAR || NYS || align=right | 8.3 km || 
|-id=198 bgcolor=#d6d6d6
| 11198 ||  || — || February 10, 1999 || Socorro || LINEAR || EOS || align=right | 7.1 km || 
|-id=199 bgcolor=#E9E9E9
| 11199 ||  || — || February 12, 1999 || Socorro || LINEAR || GEF || align=right | 6.0 km || 
|-id=200 bgcolor=#E9E9E9
| 11200 ||  || — || February 11, 1999 || Socorro || LINEAR || — || align=right | 9.1 km || 
|}

11201–11300 

|-bgcolor=#d6d6d6
| 11201 Talich ||  ||  || March 13, 1999 || Ondřejov || L. Kotková || KOR || align=right | 4.7 km || 
|-id=202 bgcolor=#E9E9E9
| 11202 Teddunham ||  ||  || March 22, 1999 || Anderson Mesa || LONEOS || — || align=right | 9.9 km || 
|-id=203 bgcolor=#fefefe
| 11203 Danielbetten ||  ||  || March 19, 1999 || Socorro || LINEAR || — || align=right | 3.7 km || 
|-id=204 bgcolor=#d6d6d6
| 11204 ||  || — || March 19, 1999 || Socorro || LINEAR || THM || align=right | 11 km || 
|-id=205 bgcolor=#d6d6d6
| 11205 ||  || — || March 19, 1999 || Socorro || LINEAR || — || align=right | 20 km || 
|-id=206 bgcolor=#E9E9E9
| 11206 Bibee ||  ||  || March 19, 1999 || Socorro || LINEAR || — || align=right | 6.1 km || 
|-id=207 bgcolor=#fefefe
| 11207 Black ||  ||  || March 20, 1999 || Socorro || LINEAR || V || align=right | 3.4 km || 
|-id=208 bgcolor=#d6d6d6
| 11208 ||  || — || April 15, 1999 || Socorro || LINEAR || EOS || align=right | 6.9 km || 
|-id=209 bgcolor=#d6d6d6
| 11209 ||  || — || April 15, 1999 || Socorro || LINEAR || EOS || align=right | 9.6 km || 
|-id=210 bgcolor=#fefefe
| 11210 ||  || — || April 6, 1999 || Socorro || LINEAR || — || align=right | 8.5 km || 
|-id=211 bgcolor=#fefefe
| 11211 ||  || — || April 6, 1999 || Socorro || LINEAR || — || align=right | 4.4 km || 
|-id=212 bgcolor=#fefefe
| 11212 Tebbutt || 1999 HS ||  || April 18, 1999 || Woomera || F. B. Zoltowski || — || align=right | 3.3 km || 
|-id=213 bgcolor=#E9E9E9
| 11213 ||  || — || April 16, 1999 || Socorro || LINEAR || — || align=right | 15 km || 
|-id=214 bgcolor=#fefefe
| 11214 ||  || — || April 16, 1999 || Socorro || LINEAR || KLI || align=right | 9.3 km || 
|-id=215 bgcolor=#d6d6d6
| 11215 ||  || — || April 17, 1999 || Socorro || LINEAR || — || align=right | 13 km || 
|-id=216 bgcolor=#fefefe
| 11216 Billhubbard ||  ||  || May 8, 1999 || Catalina || CSS || — || align=right | 3.2 km || 
|-id=217 bgcolor=#fefefe
| 11217 ||  || — || May 10, 1999 || Socorro || LINEAR || Hmoon || align=right | 2.1 km || 
|-id=218 bgcolor=#d6d6d6
| 11218 ||  || — || May 10, 1999 || Socorro || LINEAR || — || align=right | 13 km || 
|-id=219 bgcolor=#fefefe
| 11219 Benbohn ||  ||  || May 10, 1999 || Socorro || LINEAR || EUT || align=right | 3.4 km || 
|-id=220 bgcolor=#fefefe
| 11220 ||  || — || May 10, 1999 || Socorro || LINEAR || — || align=right | 6.0 km || 
|-id=221 bgcolor=#d6d6d6
| 11221 ||  || — || May 10, 1999 || Socorro || LINEAR || — || align=right | 22 km || 
|-id=222 bgcolor=#d6d6d6
| 11222 ||  || — || May 10, 1999 || Socorro || LINEAR || EOS || align=right | 8.5 km || 
|-id=223 bgcolor=#d6d6d6
| 11223 ||  || — || May 10, 1999 || Socorro || LINEAR || — || align=right | 13 km || 
|-id=224 bgcolor=#d6d6d6
| 11224 ||  || — || May 10, 1999 || Socorro || LINEAR || KOR || align=right | 5.4 km || 
|-id=225 bgcolor=#fefefe
| 11225 Borden ||  ||  || May 10, 1999 || Socorro || LINEAR || — || align=right | 3.4 km || 
|-id=226 bgcolor=#d6d6d6
| 11226 ||  || — || May 10, 1999 || Socorro || LINEAR || EOS || align=right | 12 km || 
|-id=227 bgcolor=#fefefe
| 11227 Ksenborisova ||  ||  || May 10, 1999 || Socorro || LINEAR || moon || align=right | 2.6 km || 
|-id=228 bgcolor=#fefefe
| 11228 Botnick ||  ||  || May 10, 1999 || Socorro || LINEAR || NYS || align=right | 6.2 km || 
|-id=229 bgcolor=#fefefe
| 11229 Brookebowers ||  ||  || May 10, 1999 || Socorro || LINEAR || — || align=right | 3.5 km || 
|-id=230 bgcolor=#fefefe
| 11230 ||  || — || May 10, 1999 || Socorro || LINEAR || — || align=right | 5.1 km || 
|-id=231 bgcolor=#fefefe
| 11231 ||  || — || May 10, 1999 || Socorro || LINEAR || FLO || align=right | 4.9 km || 
|-id=232 bgcolor=#d6d6d6
| 11232 ||  || — || May 12, 1999 || Socorro || LINEAR || — || align=right | 19 km || 
|-id=233 bgcolor=#E9E9E9
| 11233 ||  || — || May 12, 1999 || Socorro || LINEAR || EUN || align=right | 7.3 km || 
|-id=234 bgcolor=#E9E9E9
| 11234 ||  || — || May 12, 1999 || Socorro || LINEAR || — || align=right | 8.2 km || 
|-id=235 bgcolor=#d6d6d6
| 11235 ||  || — || May 12, 1999 || Socorro || LINEAR || EOS || align=right | 9.3 km || 
|-id=236 bgcolor=#fefefe
| 11236 ||  || — || May 18, 1999 || Socorro || LINEAR || NYS || align=right | 3.7 km || 
|-id=237 bgcolor=#E9E9E9
| 11237 ||  || — || May 18, 1999 || Socorro || LINEAR || — || align=right | 6.0 km || 
|-id=238 bgcolor=#fefefe
| 11238 Johanmaurits || 2044 P-L ||  || September 24, 1960 || Palomar || PLS || — || align=right | 3.2 km || 
|-id=239 bgcolor=#E9E9E9
| 11239 Marcgraf || 4141 P-L ||  || September 24, 1960 || Palomar || PLS || — || align=right | 5.3 km || 
|-id=240 bgcolor=#fefefe
| 11240 Piso || 4175 P-L ||  || September 24, 1960 || Palomar || PLS || FLO || align=right | 2.2 km || 
|-id=241 bgcolor=#d6d6d6
| 11241 Eckhout || 6792 P-L ||  || September 24, 1960 || Palomar || PLS || KOR || align=right | 6.1 km || 
|-id=242 bgcolor=#fefefe
| 11242 Franspost || 2144 T-1 ||  || March 25, 1971 || Palomar || PLS || V || align=right | 1.7 km || 
|-id=243 bgcolor=#E9E9E9
| 11243 de Graauw || 2157 T-1 ||  || March 25, 1971 || Palomar || PLS || — || align=right | 5.3 km || 
|-id=244 bgcolor=#fefefe
| 11244 Andrékuipers || 4314 T-2 ||  || September 29, 1973 || Palomar || PLS || NYS || align=right | 3.1 km || 
|-id=245 bgcolor=#fefefe
| 11245 Hansderijk || 3100 T-3 ||  || October 16, 1977 || Palomar || PLS || NYS || align=right | 3.6 km || 
|-id=246 bgcolor=#fefefe
| 11246 Orvillewright || 4250 T-3 ||  || October 16, 1977 || Palomar || PLS || NYS || align=right | 2.9 km || 
|-id=247 bgcolor=#d6d6d6
| 11247 Wilburwright || 4280 T-3 ||  || October 16, 1977 || Palomar || PLS || — || align=right | 9.7 km || 
|-id=248 bgcolor=#fefefe
| 11248 Blériot || 4354 T-3 ||  || October 16, 1977 || Palomar || PLS || — || align=right | 3.2 km || 
|-id=249 bgcolor=#d6d6d6
| 11249 Etna || 1971 FD ||  || March 24, 1971 || Palomar || PLS || 3:2 || align=right | 10 km || 
|-id=250 bgcolor=#E9E9E9
| 11250 || 1972 AU || — || January 14, 1972 || Hamburg-Bergedorf || L. Kohoutek || — || align=right | 7.5 km || 
|-id=251 bgcolor=#C2FFFF
| 11251 Icarion ||  ||  || September 20, 1973 || Palomar || PLS || L4 || align=right | 22 km || 
|-id=252 bgcolor=#C2FFFF
| 11252 Laërtes ||  ||  || September 19, 1973 || Palomar || PLS || L4 || align=right | 41 km || 
|-id=253 bgcolor=#fefefe
| 11253 Mesyats ||  ||  || October 26, 1976 || Nauchnij || T. M. Smirnova || — || align=right | 3.2 km || 
|-id=254 bgcolor=#fefefe
| 11254 Konkohekisui ||  ||  || February 18, 1977 || Kiso || H. Kosai, K. Furukawa || — || align=right | 4.2 km || 
|-id=255 bgcolor=#d6d6d6
| 11255 Fujiiekio ||  ||  || February 18, 1977 || Kiso || H. Kosai, K. Furukawa || THM || align=right | 10 km || 
|-id=256 bgcolor=#fefefe
| 11256 Fuglesang ||  ||  || September 2, 1978 || La Silla || C.-I. Lagerkvist || NYS || align=right | 2.1 km || 
|-id=257 bgcolor=#fefefe
| 11257 Rodionta ||  ||  || October 3, 1978 || Nauchnij || N. S. Chernykh || FLO || align=right | 6.4 km || 
|-id=258 bgcolor=#d6d6d6
| 11258 Aoyama ||  ||  || November 1, 1978 || Caussols || K. Tomita || — || align=right | 11 km || 
|-id=259 bgcolor=#E9E9E9
| 11259 Yingtungchen ||  ||  || November 7, 1978 || Palomar || E. F. Helin, S. J. Bus || — || align=right | 4.8 km || 
|-id=260 bgcolor=#fefefe
| 11260 Camargo ||  ||  || November 7, 1978 || Palomar || E. F. Helin, S. J. Bus || — || align=right | 3.3 km || 
|-id=261 bgcolor=#d6d6d6
| 11261 Krisbecker || 1978 XK ||  || December 6, 1978 || Palomar || E. Bowell, A. Warnock || — || align=right | 6.4 km || 
|-id=262 bgcolor=#fefefe
| 11262 Drube ||  ||  || June 25, 1979 || Siding Spring || E. F. Helin, S. J. Bus || — || align=right | 2.8 km || 
|-id=263 bgcolor=#d6d6d6
| 11263 Pesonen || 1979 OA ||  || July 23, 1979 || Anderson Mesa || E. Bowell || — || align=right | 10 km || 
|-id=264 bgcolor=#E9E9E9
| 11264 Claudiomaccone ||  ||  || October 16, 1979 || Nauchnij || N. S. Chernykh || moon || align=right | 3.2 km || 
|-id=265 bgcolor=#fefefe
| 11265 Hasselmann ||  ||  || March 2, 1981 || Siding Spring || S. J. Bus || — || align=right | 1.9 km || 
|-id=266 bgcolor=#d6d6d6
| 11266 Macke ||  ||  || March 2, 1981 || Siding Spring || S. J. Bus || 2:1J || align=right | 7.1 km || 
|-id=267 bgcolor=#E9E9E9
| 11267 Donaldkessler ||  ||  || October 24, 1981 || Palomar || S. J. Bus || HOF || align=right | 11 km || 
|-id=268 bgcolor=#fefefe
| 11268 Spassky ||  ||  || October 22, 1985 || Nauchnij || L. V. Zhuravleva || — || align=right | 5.1 km || 
|-id=269 bgcolor=#fefefe
| 11269 Knyr ||  ||  || August 26, 1987 || Nauchnij || L. G. Karachkina || FLO || align=right | 2.9 km || 
|-id=270 bgcolor=#fefefe
| 11270 ||  || — || March 13, 1988 || Brorfelde || P. Jensen || — || align=right | 3.9 km || 
|-id=271 bgcolor=#fefefe
| 11271 || 1988 KB || — || May 19, 1988 || Palomar || E. F. Helin || PHO || align=right | 6.8 km || 
|-id=272 bgcolor=#fefefe
| 11272 || 1988 RK || — || September 8, 1988 || Palomar || E. F. Helin || — || align=right | 6.8 km || 
|-id=273 bgcolor=#C2FFFF
| 11273 ||  || — || September 14, 1988 || Cerro Tololo || S. J. Bus || L5 || align=right | 26 km || 
|-id=274 bgcolor=#d6d6d6
| 11274 Castillo-Rogez ||  ||  || September 16, 1988 || Cerro Tololo || S. J. Bus || 3:2 || align=right | 10 km || 
|-id=275 bgcolor=#C2FFFF
| 11275 ||  || — || September 16, 1988 || Cerro Tololo || S. J. Bus || L5 || align=right | 26 km || 
|-id=276 bgcolor=#fefefe
| 11276 ||  || — || October 13, 1988 || Kushiro || S. Ueda, H. Kaneda || NYS || align=right | 3.2 km || 
|-id=277 bgcolor=#fefefe
| 11277 Ballard ||  ||  || October 8, 1988 || Palomar || C. S. Shoemaker, E. M. Shoemaker || PHO || align=right | 6.3 km || 
|-id=278 bgcolor=#fefefe
| 11278 Telesio ||  ||  || September 26, 1989 || La Silla || E. W. Elst || FLO || align=right | 3.5 km || 
|-id=279 bgcolor=#fefefe
| 11279 || 1989 TC || — || October 1, 1989 || Palomar || J. Alu, E. F. Helin || H || align=right | 3.4 km || 
|-id=280 bgcolor=#fefefe
| 11280 Sakurai ||  ||  || October 9, 1989 || Kitami || M. Yanai, K. Watanabe || — || align=right | 3.2 km || 
|-id=281 bgcolor=#fefefe
| 11281 ||  || — || October 28, 1989 || Kani || Y. Mizuno, T. Furuta || — || align=right | 3.4 km || 
|-id=282 bgcolor=#fefefe
| 11282 Hanakusa ||  ||  || October 30, 1989 || Kitami || K. Endate, K. Watanabe || NYS || align=right | 3.8 km || 
|-id=283 bgcolor=#fefefe
| 11283 ||  || — || October 25, 1989 || Kleť || A. Mrkos || NYS || align=right | 3.4 km || 
|-id=284 bgcolor=#FFC2E0
| 11284 Belenus || 1990 BA ||  || January 21, 1990 || Caussols || A. Maury || AMO +1km || align=right data-sort-value="0.83" | 830 m || 
|-id=285 bgcolor=#fefefe
| 11285 ||  || — || August 22, 1990 || Palomar || H. E. Holt || — || align=right | 3.9 km || 
|-id=286 bgcolor=#fefefe
| 11286 ||  || — || September 15, 1990 || La Silla || H. Debehogne || NYS || align=right | 3.8 km || 
|-id=287 bgcolor=#d6d6d6
| 11287 || 1990 SX || — || September 16, 1990 || Palomar || H. E. Holt || — || align=right | 11 km || 
|-id=288 bgcolor=#d6d6d6
| 11288 Okunohosomichi || 1990 XU ||  || December 10, 1990 || Geisei || T. Seki || EOS || align=right | 11 km || 
|-id=289 bgcolor=#d6d6d6
| 11289 Frescobaldi ||  ||  || August 2, 1991 || La Silla || E. W. Elst || THM || align=right | 8.8 km || 
|-id=290 bgcolor=#E9E9E9
| 11290 ||  || — || September 10, 1991 || Dynic || A. Sugie || — || align=right | 4.9 km || 
|-id=291 bgcolor=#d6d6d6
| 11291 ||  || — || September 10, 1991 || Palomar || H. E. Holt || — || align=right | 8.3 km || 
|-id=292 bgcolor=#d6d6d6
| 11292 Bunjisuzuki ||  ||  || September 8, 1991 || Kitt Peak || Spacewatch || — || align=right | 6.8 km || 
|-id=293 bgcolor=#fefefe
| 11293 || 1991 XL || — || December 4, 1991 || Kushiro || S. Ueda, H. Kaneda || FLO || align=right | 3.9 km || 
|-id=294 bgcolor=#fefefe
| 11294 Kazu || 1992 CK ||  || February 4, 1992 || Geisei || T. Seki || FLO || align=right | 3.4 km || 
|-id=295 bgcolor=#d6d6d6
| 11295 Gustaflarsson ||  ||  || March 8, 1992 || La Silla || UESAC || — || align=right | 13 km || 
|-id=296 bgcolor=#fefefe
| 11296 Denzen || 1992 KA ||  || May 24, 1992 || Geisei || T. Seki || — || align=right | 5.7 km || 
|-id=297 bgcolor=#fefefe
| 11297 ||  || — || August 5, 1992 || La Silla || H. Debehogne, Á. López-G. || — || align=right | 5.5 km || 
|-id=298 bgcolor=#d6d6d6
| 11298 Gide ||  ||  || September 2, 1992 || La Silla || E. W. Elst || KOR || align=right | 4.9 km || 
|-id=299 bgcolor=#E9E9E9
| 11299 Annafreud ||  ||  || September 22, 1992 || La Silla || E. W. Elst || — || align=right | 5.1 km || 
|-id=300 bgcolor=#fefefe
| 11300 ||  || — || November 18, 1992 || Kushiro || S. Ueda, H. Kaneda || — || align=right | 4.0 km || 
|}

11301–11400 

|-bgcolor=#d6d6d6
| 11301 || 1992 XM || — || December 14, 1992 || Kiyosato || S. Otomo || EOS || align=right | 12 km || 
|-id=302 bgcolor=#E9E9E9
| 11302 Rubicon ||  ||  || January 27, 1993 || Caussols || E. W. Elst || — || align=right | 11 km || 
|-id=303 bgcolor=#E9E9E9
| 11303 ||  || — || February 14, 1993 || Okutama || T. Hioki, S. Hayakawa || — || align=right | 6.1 km || 
|-id=304 bgcolor=#fefefe
| 11304 Cowra || 1993 DJ ||  || February 19, 1993 || Geisei || T. Seki || H || align=right | 2.4 km || 
|-id=305 bgcolor=#fefefe
| 11305 Ahlqvist ||  ||  || March 17, 1993 || La Silla || UESAC || — || align=right | 2.5 km || 
|-id=306 bgcolor=#d6d6d6
| 11306 Åkesson ||  ||  || March 17, 1993 || La Silla || UESAC || — || align=right | 8.7 km || 
|-id=307 bgcolor=#fefefe
| 11307 Erikolsson ||  ||  || March 19, 1993 || La Silla || UESAC || — || align=right | 5.3 km || 
|-id=308 bgcolor=#d6d6d6
| 11308 Tofta ||  ||  || March 21, 1993 || La Silla || UESAC || — || align=right | 6.7 km || 
|-id=309 bgcolor=#d6d6d6
| 11309 Malus ||  ||  || August 15, 1993 || Caussols || E. W. Elst || — || align=right | 14 km || 
|-id=310 bgcolor=#E9E9E9
| 11310 ||  || — || September 19, 1993 || Palomar || H. E. Holt || EUN || align=right | 6.8 km || 
|-id=311 bgcolor=#FFC2E0
| 11311 Peleus ||  ||  || December 10, 1993 || Palomar || C. S. Shoemaker, E. M. Shoemaker || APO +1km || align=right | 2.3 km || 
|-id=312 bgcolor=#fefefe
| 11312 ||  || — || January 14, 1994 || Ōizumi || T. Kobayashi || — || align=right | 3.6 km || 
|-id=313 bgcolor=#fefefe
| 11313 Kügelgen ||  ||  || April 3, 1994 || Tautenburg Observatory || F. Börngen || — || align=right | 4.0 km || 
|-id=314 bgcolor=#d6d6d6
| 11314 Charcot ||  ||  || July 8, 1994 || Caussols || E. W. Elst || — || align=right | 9.6 km || 
|-id=315 bgcolor=#fefefe
| 11315 Salpêtrière ||  ||  || July 8, 1994 || Caussols || E. W. Elst || — || align=right | 3.3 km || 
|-id=316 bgcolor=#fefefe
| 11316 Fuchitatsuo ||  ||  || October 5, 1994 || Kitami || K. Endate, K. Watanabe || NYS || align=right | 3.5 km || 
|-id=317 bgcolor=#d6d6d6
| 11317 Hitoshi ||  ||  || October 10, 1994 || Kitt Peak || Spacewatch || THM || align=right | 8.2 km || 
|-id=318 bgcolor=#FA8072
| 11318 ||  || — || December 4, 1994 || Ōizumi || T. Kobayashi || — || align=right | 1.3 km || 
|-id=319 bgcolor=#fefefe
| 11319 || 1995 AZ || — || January 6, 1995 || Ōizumi || T. Kobayashi || — || align=right | 6.1 km || 
|-id=320 bgcolor=#d6d6d6
| 11320 || 1995 BY || — || January 25, 1995 || Ōizumi || T. Kobayashi || KOR || align=right | 5.0 km || 
|-id=321 bgcolor=#d6d6d6
| 11321 Tosimatumoto ||  ||  || February 21, 1995 || Geisei || T. Seki || EOS || align=right | 9.2 km || 
|-id=322 bgcolor=#E9E9E9
| 11322 Aquamarine || 1995 QT ||  || August 23, 1995 || Yatsuka || H. Abe || GEF || align=right | 3.6 km || 
|-id=323 bgcolor=#E9E9E9
| 11323 Nasu ||  ||  || August 21, 1995 || Kitami || K. Endate, K. Watanabe || — || align=right | 5.1 km || 
|-id=324 bgcolor=#E9E9E9
| 11324 Hayamizu ||  ||  || August 30, 1995 || Kitami || K. Endate, K. Watanabe || — || align=right | 8.1 km || 
|-id=325 bgcolor=#E9E9E9
| 11325 Slavický || 1995 SG ||  || September 17, 1995 || Ondřejov || L. Kotková || — || align=right | 2.5 km || 
|-id=326 bgcolor=#fefefe
| 11326 Ladislavschmied || 1995 SL ||  || September 17, 1995 || Ondřejov || L. Kotková || V || align=right | 2.8 km || 
|-id=327 bgcolor=#E9E9E9
| 11327 ||  || — || September 17, 1995 || Nachi-Katsuura || Y. Shimizu, T. Urata || EUN || align=right | 5.8 km || 
|-id=328 bgcolor=#E9E9E9
| 11328 Mariotozzi || 1995 UL ||  || October 19, 1995 || Colleverde || V. S. Casulli || — || align=right | 9.1 km || 
|-id=329 bgcolor=#d6d6d6
| 11329 ||  || — || November 18, 1995 || Ōizumi || T. Kobayashi || — || align=right | 9.2 km || 
|-id=330 bgcolor=#d6d6d6
| 11330 ||  || — || November 18, 1995 || Nachi-Katsuura || Y. Shimizu, T. Urata || EOS || align=right | 8.2 km || 
|-id=331 bgcolor=#fefefe
| 11331 ||  || — || March 17, 1996 || Haleakalā || NEAT || MAS || align=right | 4.4 km || 
|-id=332 bgcolor=#E9E9E9
| 11332 Jameswatt ||  ||  || April 15, 1996 || La Silla || E. W. Elst || — || align=right | 4.3 km || 
|-id=333 bgcolor=#fefefe
| 11333 Forman || 1996 HU ||  || April 20, 1996 || Ondřejov || P. Pravec, L. Kotková || — || align=right | 3.6 km || 
|-id=334 bgcolor=#E9E9E9
| 11334 Rio de Janeiro ||  ||  || April 18, 1996 || La Silla || E. W. Elst || MAR || align=right | 5.1 km || 
|-id=335 bgcolor=#fefefe
| 11335 Santiago ||  ||  || April 20, 1996 || La Silla || E. W. Elst || — || align=right | 3.5 km || 
|-id=336 bgcolor=#E9E9E9
| 11336 Piranesi ||  ||  || July 14, 1996 || La Silla || E. W. Elst || — || align=right | 3.4 km || 
|-id=337 bgcolor=#fefefe
| 11337 Sandro ||  ||  || August 10, 1996 || Montelupo || M. Tombelli, G. Forti || FLO || align=right | 1.9 km || 
|-id=338 bgcolor=#fefefe
| 11338 Schiele ||  ||  || October 13, 1996 || Kleť || J. Tichá, M. Tichý || — || align=right | 6.2 km || 
|-id=339 bgcolor=#fefefe
| 11339 Orlík ||  ||  || November 13, 1996 || Kleť || M. Tichý, Z. Moravec || — || align=right | 4.0 km || 
|-id=340 bgcolor=#d6d6d6
| 11340 ||  || — || November 14, 1996 || Oohira || T. Urata || — || align=right | 11 km || 
|-id=341 bgcolor=#fefefe
| 11341 Babbage ||  ||  || December 3, 1996 || Prescott || P. G. Comba || V || align=right | 4.4 km || 
|-id=342 bgcolor=#E9E9E9
| 11342 ||  || — || December 8, 1996 || Ōizumi || T. Kobayashi || — || align=right | 5.8 km || 
|-id=343 bgcolor=#fefefe
| 11343 ||  || — || December 8, 1996 || Ōizumi || T. Kobayashi || — || align=right | 2.8 km || 
|-id=344 bgcolor=#fefefe
| 11344 ||  || — || December 14, 1996 || Ōizumi || T. Kobayashi || NYS || align=right | 2.9 km || 
|-id=345 bgcolor=#fefefe
| 11345 || 1996 YM || — || December 20, 1996 || Ōizumi || T. Kobayashi || NYS || align=right | 2.8 km || 
|-id=346 bgcolor=#E9E9E9
| 11346 ||  || — || January 10, 1997 || Ōizumi || T. Kobayashi || — || align=right | 6.7 km || 
|-id=347 bgcolor=#fefefe
| 11347 ||  || — || January 9, 1997 || Kushiro || S. Ueda, H. Kaneda || — || align=right | 5.3 km || 
|-id=348 bgcolor=#d6d6d6
| 11348 Allegra ||  ||  || January 30, 1997 || Cima Ekar || M. Tombelli, U. Munari || KOR || align=right | 6.2 km || 
|-id=349 bgcolor=#fefefe
| 11349 Witten ||  ||  || May 3, 1997 || La Silla || E. W. Elst || V || align=right | 2.9 km || 
|-id=350 bgcolor=#d6d6d6
| 11350 Teresa ||  ||  || August 29, 1997 || Majorca || Á. López J., R. Pacheco || KOR || align=right | 5.8 km || 
|-id=351 bgcolor=#C2FFFF
| 11351 Leucus ||  ||  || October 12, 1997 || Xinglong || SCAP || L4slow || align=right | 34 km || 
|-id=352 bgcolor=#d6d6d6
| 11352 Koldewey ||  ||  || November 28, 1997 || Caussols || ODAS || THM || align=right | 13 km || 
|-id=353 bgcolor=#d6d6d6
| 11353 Guillaume ||  ||  || December 5, 1997 || Caussols || ODAS || KOR || align=right | 5.6 km || 
|-id=354 bgcolor=#fefefe
| 11354 ||  || — || December 5, 1997 || Ōizumi || T. Kobayashi || NYS || align=right | 3.5 km || 
|-id=355 bgcolor=#E9E9E9
| 11355 ||  || — || December 15, 1997 || Xinglong || SCAP || WIT || align=right | 5.7 km || 
|-id=356 bgcolor=#d6d6d6
| 11356 Chuckjones || 1997 YA ||  || December 18, 1997 || Woomera || F. B. Zoltowski || — || align=right | 8.6 km || 
|-id=357 bgcolor=#d6d6d6
| 11357 ||  || — || December 21, 1997 || Ōizumi || T. Kobayashi || — || align=right | 6.3 km || 
|-id=358 bgcolor=#d6d6d6
| 11358 ||  || — || December 25, 1997 || Ōizumi || T. Kobayashi || EOS || align=right | 14 km || 
|-id=359 bgcolor=#E9E9E9
| 11359 Piteglio ||  ||  || January 27, 1998 || San Marcello || L. Tesi, V. Cecchini || — || align=right | 4.7 km || 
|-id=360 bgcolor=#fefefe
| 11360 Formigine ||  ||  || February 24, 1998 || Bologna || San Vittore Obs. || NYS || align=right | 2.1 km || 
|-id=361 bgcolor=#fefefe
| 11361 Orbinskij ||  ||  || February 28, 1998 || Geisei || T. Seki || — || align=right | 4.5 km || 
|-id=362 bgcolor=#E9E9E9
| 11362 ||  || — || March 6, 1998 || Gekko || T. Kagawa || — || align=right | 5.5 km || 
|-id=363 bgcolor=#fefefe
| 11363 Vives ||  ||  || March 1, 1998 || La Silla || E. W. Elst || — || align=right | 4.3 km || 
|-id=364 bgcolor=#E9E9E9
| 11364 Karlštejn ||  ||  || March 23, 1998 || Ondřejov || P. Pravec || — || align=right | 3.2 km || 
|-id=365 bgcolor=#fefefe
| 11365 NASA ||  ||  || March 23, 1998 || Reedy Creek || J. Broughton || — || align=right | 3.8 km || 
|-id=366 bgcolor=#E9E9E9
| 11366 ||  || — || April 2, 1998 || Socorro || LINEAR || — || align=right | 7.5 km || 
|-id=367 bgcolor=#E9E9E9
| 11367 ||  || — || April 23, 1998 || Socorro || LINEAR || — || align=right | 5.3 km || 
|-id=368 bgcolor=#E9E9E9
| 11368 ||  || — || April 23, 1998 || Socorro || LINEAR || GEF || align=right | 8.0 km || 
|-id=369 bgcolor=#fefefe
| 11369 Brazelton ||  ||  || August 17, 1998 || Socorro || LINEAR || FLO || align=right | 2.8 km || 
|-id=370 bgcolor=#E9E9E9
| 11370 Nabrown ||  ||  || August 17, 1998 || Socorro || LINEAR || — || align=right | 4.3 km || 
|-id=371 bgcolor=#fefefe
| 11371 Camley ||  ||  || August 17, 1998 || Socorro || LINEAR || NYS || align=right | 2.8 km || 
|-id=372 bgcolor=#d6d6d6
| 11372 ||  || — || August 17, 1998 || Socorro || LINEAR || KOR || align=right | 5.6 km || 
|-id=373 bgcolor=#fefefe
| 11373 Carbonaro ||  ||  || August 17, 1998 || Socorro || LINEAR || — || align=right | 2.2 km || 
|-id=374 bgcolor=#fefefe
| 11374 Briantaylor ||  ||  || August 23, 1998 || Anderson Mesa || LONEOS || V || align=right | 2.8 km || 
|-id=375 bgcolor=#d6d6d6
| 11375 ||  || — || August 24, 1998 || Socorro || LINEAR || EOS || align=right | 12 km || 
|-id=376 bgcolor=#fefefe
| 11376 Taizomuta ||  ||  || September 20, 1998 || Kitt Peak || Spacewatch || MAS || align=right | 3.1 km || 
|-id=377 bgcolor=#d6d6d6
| 11377 Nye ||  ||  || September 17, 1998 || Anderson Mesa || LONEOS || THM || align=right | 9.8 km || 
|-id=378 bgcolor=#fefefe
| 11378 Dauria ||  ||  || September 17, 1998 || Anderson Mesa || LONEOS || — || align=right | 6.8 km || 
|-id=379 bgcolor=#E9E9E9
| 11379 Flaubert ||  ||  || September 21, 1998 || La Silla || E. W. Elst || — || align=right | 4.8 km || 
|-id=380 bgcolor=#fefefe
| 11380 ||  || — || September 26, 1998 || Socorro || LINEAR || — || align=right | 3.9 km || 
|-id=381 bgcolor=#d6d6d6
| 11381 ||  || — || September 26, 1998 || Socorro || LINEAR || HYG || align=right | 12 km || 
|-id=382 bgcolor=#fefefe
| 11382 ||  || — || September 26, 1998 || Socorro || LINEAR || — || align=right | 2.4 km || 
|-id=383 bgcolor=#E9E9E9
| 11383 ||  || — || September 26, 1998 || Socorro || LINEAR || — || align=right | 6.4 km || 
|-id=384 bgcolor=#fefefe
| 11384 Sartre ||  ||  || September 18, 1998 || La Silla || E. W. Elst || NYS || align=right | 1.8 km || 
|-id=385 bgcolor=#d6d6d6
| 11385 Beauvoir ||  ||  || September 20, 1998 || La Silla || E. W. Elst || — || align=right | 13 km || 
|-id=386 bgcolor=#fefefe
| 11386 ||  || — || October 12, 1998 || Kushiro || S. Ueda, H. Kaneda || — || align=right | 13 km || 
|-id=387 bgcolor=#E9E9E9
| 11387 ||  || — || October 28, 1998 || Socorro || LINEAR || — || align=right | 5.6 km || 
|-id=388 bgcolor=#d6d6d6
| 11388 ||  || — || November 11, 1998 || Ondřejov || L. Kotková || HIL3:2 || align=right | 25 km || 
|-id=389 bgcolor=#d6d6d6
| 11389 ||  || — || November 11, 1998 || Ōizumi || T. Kobayashi || HYG || align=right | 13 km || 
|-id=390 bgcolor=#d6d6d6
| 11390 ||  || — || November 10, 1998 || Socorro || LINEAR || THM || align=right | 11 km || 
|-id=391 bgcolor=#fefefe
| 11391 ||  || — || November 12, 1998 || Kushiro || S. Ueda, H. Kaneda || — || align=right | 4.2 km || 
|-id=392 bgcolor=#E9E9E9
| 11392 Paulpeeters ||  ||  || November 19, 1998 || Caussols || ODAS || PAD || align=right | 7.8 km || 
|-id=393 bgcolor=#d6d6d6
| 11393 ||  || — || December 14, 1998 || Socorro || LINEAR || — || align=right | 13 km || 
|-id=394 bgcolor=#d6d6d6
| 11394 ||  || — || December 15, 1998 || Socorro || LINEAR || — || align=right | 17 km || 
|-id=395 bgcolor=#C2FFFF
| 11395 Iphinous ||  ||  || December 15, 1998 || Socorro || LINEAR || L4 || align=right | 69 km || 
|-id=396 bgcolor=#C2FFFF
| 11396 ||  || — || December 15, 1998 || Socorro || LINEAR || L4 || align=right | 37 km || 
|-id=397 bgcolor=#C2FFFF
| 11397 ||  || — || December 15, 1998 || Socorro || LINEAR || L4 || align=right | 45 km || 
|-id=398 bgcolor=#FFC2E0
| 11398 ||  || — || December 23, 1998 || Socorro || LINEAR || AMO +1km || align=right | 1.3 km || 
|-id=399 bgcolor=#fefefe
| 11399 ||  || — || January 10, 1999 || Ōizumi || T. Kobayashi || FLO || align=right | 3.7 km || 
|-id=400 bgcolor=#fefefe
| 11400 Raša ||  ||  || January 15, 1999 || Višnjan Observatory || K. Korlević || — || align=right | 2.4 km || 
|}

11401–11500 

|-bgcolor=#fefefe
| 11401 Pierralba ||  ||  || January 15, 1999 || Caussols || ODAS || FLO || align=right | 3.9 km || 
|-id=402 bgcolor=#fefefe
| 11402 || 1999 BD || — || January 16, 1999 || Ōizumi || T. Kobayashi || — || align=right | 3.0 km || 
|-id=403 bgcolor=#E9E9E9
| 11403 || 1999 BW || — || January 16, 1999 || Gekko || T. Kagawa || — || align=right | 6.9 km || 
|-id=404 bgcolor=#d6d6d6
| 11404 Wittig ||  ||  || January 19, 1999 || Caussols || ODAS || — || align=right | 9.8 km || 
|-id=405 bgcolor=#FFC2E0
| 11405 ||  || — || February 10, 1999 || Socorro || LINEAR || APO +1km || align=right | 3.6 km || 
|-id=406 bgcolor=#E9E9E9
| 11406 Ucciocontin ||  ||  || February 15, 1999 || Višnjan Observatory || K. Korlević || — || align=right | 5.9 km || 
|-id=407 bgcolor=#fefefe
| 11407 ||  || — || February 10, 1999 || Socorro || LINEAR || — || align=right | 3.1 km || 
|-id=408 bgcolor=#d6d6d6
| 11408 Zahradník ||  ||  || March 13, 1999 || Ondřejov || L. Kotková || THM || align=right | 11 km || 
|-id=409 bgcolor=#d6d6d6
| 11409 Horkheimer ||  ||  || March 19, 1999 || Anderson Mesa || LONEOS || THM || align=right | 15 km || 
|-id=410 bgcolor=#d6d6d6
| 11410 ||  || — || March 19, 1999 || Socorro || LINEAR || 3:2 || align=right | 28 km || 
|-id=411 bgcolor=#fefefe
| 11411 ||  || — || April 16, 1999 || Socorro || LINEAR || H || align=right | 2.5 km || 
|-id=412 bgcolor=#d6d6d6
| 11412 ||  || — || May 10, 1999 || Socorro || LINEAR || EOS || align=right | 8.7 km || 
|-id=413 bgcolor=#fefefe
| 11413 Catanach ||  ||  || May 10, 1999 || Socorro || LINEAR || — || align=right | 3.8 km || 
|-id=414 bgcolor=#fefefe
| 11414 Allanchu ||  ||  || May 10, 1999 || Socorro || LINEAR || — || align=right | 4.2 km || 
|-id=415 bgcolor=#fefefe
| 11415 ||  || — || May 14, 1999 || Socorro || LINEAR || FLO || align=right | 3.4 km || 
|-id=416 bgcolor=#d6d6d6
| 11416 ||  || — || May 12, 1999 || Socorro || LINEAR || — || align=right | 12 km || 
|-id=417 bgcolor=#E9E9E9
| 11417 Chughtai ||  ||  || May 13, 1999 || Socorro || LINEAR || — || align=right | 5.2 km || 
|-id=418 bgcolor=#E9E9E9
| 11418 ||  || — || May 13, 1999 || Socorro || LINEAR || PAD || align=right | 9.1 km || 
|-id=419 bgcolor=#d6d6d6
| 11419 Donjohnson ||  ||  || May 16, 1999 || Kitt Peak || Spacewatch || EOS || align=right | 9.6 km || 
|-id=420 bgcolor=#fefefe
| 11420 ||  || — || May 18, 1999 || Socorro || LINEAR || FLO || align=right | 3.8 km || 
|-id=421 bgcolor=#d6d6d6
| 11421 Cardano ||  ||  || June 10, 1999 || Prescott || P. G. Comba || — || align=right | 14 km || 
|-id=422 bgcolor=#E9E9E9
| 11422 Alilienthal ||  ||  || June 10, 1999 || Kitt Peak || Spacewatch || — || align=right | 3.9 km || 
|-id=423 bgcolor=#E9E9E9
| 11423 Cronin ||  ||  || June 9, 1999 || Socorro || LINEAR || — || align=right | 4.4 km || 
|-id=424 bgcolor=#fefefe
| 11424 ||  || — || June 9, 1999 || Socorro || LINEAR || — || align=right | 13 km || 
|-id=425 bgcolor=#fefefe
| 11425 Wearydunlop || 1999 MF ||  || June 18, 1999 || Reedy Creek || J. Broughton || NYS || align=right | 2.0 km || 
|-id=426 bgcolor=#d6d6d6
| 11426 Molster || 2527 P-L ||  || September 24, 1960 || Palomar || PLS || THB || align=right | 9.5 km || 
|-id=427 bgcolor=#d6d6d6
| 11427 Willemkolff || 2611 P-L ||  || September 24, 1960 || Palomar || PLS || — || align=right | 12 km || 
|-id=428 bgcolor=#C2FFFF
| 11428 Alcinoös || 4139 P-L ||  || September 24, 1960 || Palomar || PLS || L4 || align=right | 32 km || 
|-id=429 bgcolor=#C2FFFF
| 11429 Demodokus || 4655 P-L ||  || September 24, 1960 || Palomar || PLS || L4 || align=right | 38 km || 
|-id=430 bgcolor=#fefefe
| 11430 Lodewijkberg || 9560 P-L ||  || October 17, 1960 || Palomar || PLS || FLO || align=right | 2.2 km || 
|-id=431 bgcolor=#d6d6d6
| 11431 Karelbosscha || 4843 T-1 ||  || May 13, 1971 || Palomar || PLS || HYG || align=right | 6.8 km || 
|-id=432 bgcolor=#d6d6d6
| 11432 Kerkhoven || 1052 T-2 ||  || September 29, 1973 || Palomar || PLS || THM || align=right | 7.7 km || 
|-id=433 bgcolor=#fefefe
| 11433 Gemmafrisius || 3474 T-3 ||  || October 16, 1977 || Palomar || PLS || NYS || align=right | 3.4 km || 
|-id=434 bgcolor=#E9E9E9
| 11434 Lohnert ||  ||  || October 10, 1931 || Heidelberg || K. Reinmuth || CLO || align=right | 9.6 km || 
|-id=435 bgcolor=#fefefe
| 11435 || 1931 UB || — || October 17, 1931 || Heidelberg || K. Reinmuth || NYS || align=right | 4.2 km || 
|-id=436 bgcolor=#fefefe
| 11436 || 1969 QR || — || August 22, 1969 || Hamburg-Bergedorf || L. Kohoutek || — || align=right | 3.7 km || 
|-id=437 bgcolor=#fefefe
| 11437 Cardalda || 1971 SB ||  || September 16, 1971 || El Leoncito || J. Gibson, C. U. Cesco || H || align=right | 3.7 km || 
|-id=438 bgcolor=#fefefe
| 11438 Zeldovich ||  ||  || August 29, 1973 || Nauchnij || T. M. Smirnova || — || align=right | 5.0 km || 
|-id=439 bgcolor=#E9E9E9
| 11439 || 1974 XW || — || December 14, 1974 || Nanking || Purple Mountain Obs. || — || align=right | 9.2 km || 
|-id=440 bgcolor=#d6d6d6
| 11440 Massironi ||  ||  || September 30, 1975 || Palomar || S. J. Bus || SYL7:4 || align=right | 12 km || 
|-id=441 bgcolor=#E9E9E9
| 11441 Anadiego || 1975 YD ||  || December 31, 1975 || El Leoncito || M. R. Cesco || — || align=right | 6.8 km || 
|-id=442 bgcolor=#fefefe
| 11442 Seijin-Sanso ||  ||  || October 22, 1976 || Kiso || H. Kosai, K. Furukawa || — || align=right | 4.2 km || 
|-id=443 bgcolor=#fefefe
| 11443 Youdale || 1977 CP ||  || February 11, 1977 || Palomar || E. Bowell || EUT || align=right | 2.9 km || 
|-id=444 bgcolor=#fefefe
| 11444 Peshekhonov ||  ||  || August 31, 1978 || Nauchnij || N. S. Chernykh || — || align=right | 3.1 km || 
|-id=445 bgcolor=#E9E9E9
| 11445 Fedotov ||  ||  || September 26, 1978 || Nauchnij || L. V. Zhuravleva || EUN || align=right | 4.5 km || 
|-id=446 bgcolor=#d6d6d6
| 11446 Betankur ||  ||  || October 9, 1978 || Nauchnij || L. V. Zhuravleva || — || align=right | 11 km || 
|-id=447 bgcolor=#E9E9E9
| 11447 ||  || — || October 27, 1978 || Palomar || C. M. Olmstead || — || align=right | 5.3 km || 
|-id=448 bgcolor=#fefefe
| 11448 Miahajduková ||  ||  || June 25, 1979 || Siding Spring || E. F. Helin, S. J. Bus || — || align=right | 2.6 km || 
|-id=449 bgcolor=#d6d6d6
| 11449 Stephwerner || 1979 QP ||  || August 22, 1979 || La Silla || C.-I. Lagerkvist || KOR || align=right | 7.8 km || 
|-id=450 bgcolor=#fefefe
| 11450 Shearer ||  ||  || August 22, 1979 || La Silla || C.-I. Lagerkvist || — || align=right | 5.0 km || 
|-id=451 bgcolor=#d6d6d6
| 11451 Aarongolden ||  ||  || August 22, 1979 || La Silla || C.-I. Lagerkvist || — || align=right | 9.4 km || 
|-id=452 bgcolor=#fefefe
| 11452 || 1980 KE || — || May 22, 1980 || La Silla || H. Debehogne || — || align=right | 4.7 km || 
|-id=453 bgcolor=#E9E9E9
| 11453 Cañada-Assandri ||  ||  || February 28, 1981 || Siding Spring || S. J. Bus || — || align=right | 4.8 km || 
|-id=454 bgcolor=#E9E9E9
| 11454 Mariomelita ||  ||  || February 28, 1981 || Siding Spring || S. J. Bus || MAR || align=right | 5.7 km || 
|-id=455 bgcolor=#d6d6d6
| 11455 Richardstarr ||  ||  || March 2, 1981 || Siding Spring || S. J. Bus || — || align=right | 5.1 km || 
|-id=456 bgcolor=#d6d6d6
| 11456 Cotto-Figueroa ||  ||  || March 1, 1981 || Siding Spring || S. J. Bus || — || align=right | 11 km || 
|-id=457 bgcolor=#fefefe
| 11457 Hitomikobayashi ||  ||  || March 1, 1981 || Siding Spring || S. J. Bus || FLO || align=right | 1.5 km || 
|-id=458 bgcolor=#d6d6d6
| 11458 Rosemarypike ||  ||  || March 1, 1981 || Siding Spring || S. J. Bus || EOS || align=right | 7.9 km || 
|-id=459 bgcolor=#fefefe
| 11459 Andráspál ||  ||  || March 1, 1981 || Siding Spring || S. J. Bus || — || align=right | 2.9 km || 
|-id=460 bgcolor=#fefefe
| 11460 Juliafang ||  ||  || March 1, 1981 || Siding Spring || S. J. Bus || FLO || align=right | 1.7 km || 
|-id=461 bgcolor=#fefefe
| 11461 Wladimirneumann ||  ||  || March 2, 1981 || Siding Spring || S. J. Bus || FLO || align=right | 3.5 km || 
|-id=462 bgcolor=#E9E9E9
| 11462 Hsingwenlin ||  ||  || March 3, 1981 || Siding Spring || S. J. Bus || — || align=right | 3.1 km || 
|-id=463 bgcolor=#fefefe
| 11463 Petrpokorny ||  ||  || March 2, 1981 || Siding Spring || S. J. Bus || — || align=right | 2.7 km || 
|-id=464 bgcolor=#d6d6d6
| 11464 Moser ||  ||  || March 6, 1981 || Siding Spring || S. J. Bus || — || align=right | 5.4 km || 
|-id=465 bgcolor=#d6d6d6
| 11465 Fulvio ||  ||  || March 2, 1981 || Siding Spring || S. J. Bus || — || align=right | 13 km || 
|-id=466 bgcolor=#FA8072
| 11466 Katharinaotto ||  ||  || March 1, 1981 || Siding Spring || S. J. Bus || — || align=right | 2.8 km || 
|-id=467 bgcolor=#E9E9E9
| 11467 Simonporter ||  ||  || March 3, 1981 || Siding Spring || S. J. Bus || — || align=right | 2.8 km || 
|-id=468 bgcolor=#d6d6d6
| 11468 Shantanunaidu ||  ||  || March 2, 1981 || Siding Spring || S. J. Bus || THM || align=right | 6.5 km || 
|-id=469 bgcolor=#fefefe
| 11469 Rozitis ||  ||  || March 2, 1981 || Siding Spring || S. J. Bus || — || align=right | 2.2 km || 
|-id=470 bgcolor=#E9E9E9
| 11470 Davidminton ||  ||  || March 2, 1981 || Siding Spring || S. J. Bus || — || align=right | 4.0 km || 
|-id=471 bgcolor=#E9E9E9
| 11471 Toshihirabayashi ||  ||  || March 6, 1981 || Siding Spring || S. J. Bus || — || align=right | 2.9 km || 
|-id=472 bgcolor=#fefefe
| 11472 ||  || — || September 24, 1981 || Bickley || Perth Obs. || NYS || align=right | 2.7 km || 
|-id=473 bgcolor=#E9E9E9
| 11473 Barbaresco || 1982 SC ||  || September 22, 1982 || Anderson Mesa || E. Bowell || — || align=right | 8.3 km || 
|-id=474 bgcolor=#fefefe
| 11474 ||  || — || September 18, 1982 || La Silla || H. Debehogne || FLOslow? || align=right | 2.7 km || 
|-id=475 bgcolor=#fefefe
| 11475 Velinský || 1982 VL ||  || November 11, 1982 || Kleť || Z. Vávrová || — || align=right | 3.8 km || 
|-id=476 bgcolor=#fefefe
| 11476 Stefanosimoni ||  ||  || April 23, 1984 || La Silla || V. Zappalà || NYS || align=right | 2.5 km || 
|-id=477 bgcolor=#d6d6d6
| 11477 ||  || — || September 29, 1984 || Kleť || A. Mrkos || EOS || align=right | 11 km || 
|-id=478 bgcolor=#E9E9E9
| 11478 || 1985 CD || — || February 14, 1985 || Toyota || K. Suzuki, T. Urata || — || align=right | 5.6 km || 
|-id=479 bgcolor=#d6d6d6
| 11479 ||  || — || March 6, 1986 || La Silla || G. DeSanctis || THM || align=right | 17 km || 
|-id=480 bgcolor=#fefefe
| 11480 Velikij Ustyug ||  ||  || September 7, 1986 || Nauchnij || L. I. Chernykh || FLO || align=right | 3.0 km || 
|-id=481 bgcolor=#E9E9E9
| 11481 Znannya ||  ||  || November 22, 1987 || Anderson Mesa || E. Bowell || — || align=right | 7.2 km || 
|-id=482 bgcolor=#E9E9E9
| 11482 || 1988 BW || — || January 25, 1988 || Kushiro || S. Ueda, H. Kaneda || EUN || align=right | 5.9 km || 
|-id=483 bgcolor=#E9E9E9
| 11483 ||  || — || January 19, 1988 || La Silla || H. Debehogne || — || align=right | 3.6 km || 
|-id=484 bgcolor=#E9E9E9
| 11484 Daudet ||  ||  || February 17, 1988 || La Silla || E. W. Elst || — || align=right | 3.9 km || 
|-id=485 bgcolor=#d6d6d6
| 11485 Zinzendorf ||  ||  || September 8, 1988 || Tautenburg Observatory || F. Börngen || THM || align=right | 7.7 km || 
|-id=486 bgcolor=#fefefe
| 11486 ||  || — || September 5, 1988 || La Silla || H. Debehogne || EUT || align=right | 2.8 km || 
|-id=487 bgcolor=#C2FFFF
| 11487 ||  || — || September 14, 1988 || Cerro Tololo || S. J. Bus || L5 || align=right | 32 km || 
|-id=488 bgcolor=#C2FFFF
| 11488 ||  || — || September 14, 1988 || Cerro Tololo || S. J. Bus || L5 || align=right | 22 km || 
|-id=489 bgcolor=#fefefe
| 11489 || 1988 SN || — || September 22, 1988 || Kushiro || S. Ueda, H. Kaneda || V || align=right | 4.0 km || 
|-id=490 bgcolor=#fefefe
| 11490 || 1988 TE || — || October 3, 1988 || Kushiro || S. Ueda, H. Kaneda || NYS || align=right | 3.8 km || 
|-id=491 bgcolor=#fefefe
| 11491 ||  || — || November 8, 1988 || Kushiro || S. Ueda, H. Kaneda || NYS || align=right | 6.4 km || 
|-id=492 bgcolor=#fefefe
| 11492 Shimose ||  ||  || November 13, 1988 || Kitami || K. Endate, K. Watanabe || NYS || align=right | 4.3 km || 
|-id=493 bgcolor=#fefefe
| 11493 ||  || — || November 4, 1988 || Kleť || A. Mrkos || NYS || align=right | 3.1 km || 
|-id=494 bgcolor=#fefefe
| 11494 Hibiki ||  ||  || November 2, 1988 || Kitami || M. Yanai, K. Watanabe || — || align=right | 8.9 km || 
|-id=495 bgcolor=#fefefe
| 11495 Fukunaga || 1988 XR ||  || December 3, 1988 || Kitami || K. Endate, K. Watanabe || — || align=right | 2.7 km || 
|-id=496 bgcolor=#E9E9E9
| 11496 Grass ||  ||  || January 10, 1989 || Tautenburg Observatory || F. Börngen || — || align=right | 4.2 km || 
|-id=497 bgcolor=#E9E9E9
| 11497 ||  || — || February 6, 1989 || Palomar || E. F. Helin || — || align=right | 7.9 km || 
|-id=498 bgcolor=#E9E9E9
| 11498 Julgeerts ||  ||  || April 3, 1989 || La Silla || E. W. Elst || — || align=right | 5.9 km || 
|-id=499 bgcolor=#fefefe
| 11499 Duras || 1989 RL ||  || September 2, 1989 || Haute-Provence || E. W. Elst || — || align=right | 3.0 km || 
|-id=500 bgcolor=#FFC2E0
| 11500 Tomaiyowit || 1989 UR ||  || October 28, 1989 || Palomar || J. E. Mueller, J. D. Mendenhall || APOPHA || align=right data-sort-value="0.74" | 740 m || 
|}

11501–11600 

|-bgcolor=#fefefe
| 11501 ||  || — || October 29, 1989 || Kani || Y. Mizuno, T. Furuta || — || align=right | 3.2 km || 
|-id=502 bgcolor=#d6d6d6
| 11502 ||  || — || November 21, 1989 || Kushiro || S. Ueda, H. Kaneda || THM || align=right | 12 km || 
|-id=503 bgcolor=#fefefe
| 11503 || 1990 BF || — || January 21, 1990 || Kani || Y. Mizuno, T. Furuta || FLO || align=right | 5.1 km || 
|-id=504 bgcolor=#fefefe
| 11504 Kazo || 1990 BT ||  || January 21, 1990 || Okutama || T. Hioki, S. Hayakawa || — || align=right | 4.3 km || 
|-id=505 bgcolor=#d6d6d6
| 11505 ||  || — || February 24, 1990 || La Silla || H. Debehogne || 7:4 || align=right | 17 km || 
|-id=506 bgcolor=#fefefe
| 11506 Toulouse-Lautrec ||  ||  || March 2, 1990 || La Silla || E. W. Elst || — || align=right | 3.2 km || 
|-id=507 bgcolor=#E9E9E9
| 11507 Danpascu || 1990 OF ||  || July 20, 1990 || Palomar || E. F. Helin || — || align=right | 5.4 km || 
|-id=508 bgcolor=#E9E9E9
| 11508 Stolte ||  ||  || October 12, 1990 || Tautenburg Observatory || L. D. Schmadel, F. Börngen || GEF || align=right | 6.6 km || 
|-id=509 bgcolor=#C2FFFF
| 11509 Thersilochos ||  ||  || November 15, 1990 || La Silla || E. W. Elst || L5 || align=right | 50 km || 
|-id=510 bgcolor=#d6d6d6
| 11510 Borges ||  ||  || November 11, 1990 || La Silla || E. W. Elst || BRA || align=right | 8.4 km || 
|-id=511 bgcolor=#E9E9E9
| 11511 ||  || — || November 18, 1990 || Palomar || E. F. Helin || — || align=right | 6.1 km || 
|-id=512 bgcolor=#fefefe
| 11512 ||  || — || January 11, 1991 || Palomar || E. F. Helin || — || align=right | 4.3 km || 
|-id=513 bgcolor=#d6d6d6
| 11513 ||  || — || February 12, 1991 || Yatsugatake || Y. Kushida, O. Muramatsu || — || align=right | 16 km || 
|-id=514 bgcolor=#d6d6d6
| 11514 Tsunenaga ||  ||  || February 13, 1991 || Sendai || M. Koishikawa || EOS || align=right | 12 km || 
|-id=515 bgcolor=#d6d6d6
| 11515 Oshijyo ||  ||  || February 12, 1991 || Yorii || M. Arai, H. Mori || — || align=right | 9.7 km || 
|-id=516 bgcolor=#fefefe
| 11516 Arthurpage || 1991 ED ||  || March 6, 1991 || Geisei || T. Seki || V || align=right | 2.9 km || 
|-id=517 bgcolor=#d6d6d6
| 11517 Esteracuna ||  ||  || March 12, 1991 || La Silla || H. Debehogne || THM || align=right | 10 km || 
|-id=518 bgcolor=#d6d6d6
| 11518 Jung ||  ||  || April 8, 1991 || La Silla || E. W. Elst || THM || align=right | 13 km || 
|-id=519 bgcolor=#fefefe
| 11519 Adler ||  ||  || April 8, 1991 || La Silla || E. W. Elst || MAS || align=right | 2.6 km || 
|-id=520 bgcolor=#fefefe
| 11520 Fromm ||  ||  || April 8, 1991 || La Silla || E. W. Elst || FLO || align=right | 3.1 km || 
|-id=521 bgcolor=#d6d6d6
| 11521 Erikson ||  ||  || April 10, 1991 || La Silla || E. W. Elst || THM || align=right | 12 km || 
|-id=522 bgcolor=#fefefe
| 11522 || 1991 JF || — || May 3, 1991 || Oohira || T. Urata || V || align=right | 3.7 km || 
|-id=523 bgcolor=#E9E9E9
| 11523 ||  || — || August 15, 1991 || Palomar || E. F. Helin || — || align=right | 4.1 km || 
|-id=524 bgcolor=#fefefe
| 11524 Pleyel ||  ||  || August 2, 1991 || La Silla || E. W. Elst || — || align=right | 5.4 km || 
|-id=525 bgcolor=#E9E9E9
| 11525 ||  || — || September 11, 1991 || Palomar || H. E. Holt || — || align=right | 4.3 km || 
|-id=526 bgcolor=#E9E9E9
| 11526 ||  || — || October 31, 1991 || Kushiro || S. Ueda, H. Kaneda || ADE || align=right | 5.6 km || 
|-id=527 bgcolor=#E9E9E9
| 11527 ||  || — || November 5, 1991 || Kiyosato || S. Otomo || — || align=right | 7.3 km || 
|-id=528 bgcolor=#E9E9E9
| 11528 Mie || 1991 XH ||  || December 3, 1991 || Yatsugatake || Y. Kushida, O. Muramatsu || — || align=right | 8.4 km || 
|-id=529 bgcolor=#E9E9E9
| 11529 ||  || — || January 28, 1992 || Kushiro || S. Ueda, H. Kaneda || — || align=right | 3.7 km || 
|-id=530 bgcolor=#E9E9E9
| 11530 d'Indy ||  ||  || February 2, 1992 || La Silla || E. W. Elst || WIT || align=right | 5.0 km || 
|-id=531 bgcolor=#d6d6d6
| 11531 ||  || — || February 29, 1992 || La Silla || UESAC || — || align=right | 11 km || 
|-id=532 bgcolor=#d6d6d6
| 11532 Gullin ||  ||  || March 1, 1992 || La Silla || UESAC || KOR || align=right | 5.9 km || 
|-id=533 bgcolor=#d6d6d6
| 11533 Akebäck ||  ||  || March 1, 1992 || La Silla || UESAC || — || align=right | 7.1 km || 
|-id=534 bgcolor=#d6d6d6
| 11534 ||  || — || March 1, 1992 || La Silla || UESAC || KOR || align=right | 7.9 km || 
|-id=535 bgcolor=#d6d6d6
| 11535 ||  || — || March 4, 1992 || La Silla || UESAC || KOR || align=right | 5.6 km || 
|-id=536 bgcolor=#d6d6d6
| 11536 || 1992 FZ || — || March 26, 1992 || Kushiro || S. Ueda, H. Kaneda || — || align=right | 20 km || 
|-id=537 bgcolor=#fefefe
| 11537 Guericke ||  ||  || April 29, 1992 || Tautenburg Observatory || F. Börngen || FLO || align=right | 2.7 km || 
|-id=538 bgcolor=#fefefe
| 11538 Brunico ||  ||  || July 22, 1992 || La Silla || H. Debehogne, Á. López-G. || V || align=right | 3.4 km || 
|-id=539 bgcolor=#fefefe
| 11539 ||  || — || August 2, 1992 || Palomar || H. E. Holt || V || align=right | 2.6 km || 
|-id=540 bgcolor=#fefefe
| 11540 ||  || — || August 5, 1992 || Palomar || H. E. Holt || FLO || align=right | 3.2 km || 
|-id=541 bgcolor=#fefefe
| 11541 ||  || — || September 28, 1992 || Kushiro || S. Ueda, H. Kaneda || — || align=right | 3.9 km || 
|-id=542 bgcolor=#d6d6d6
| 11542 Solikamsk ||  ||  || September 22, 1992 || La Silla || E. W. Elst || 3:2 || align=right | 30 km || 
|-id=543 bgcolor=#fefefe
| 11543 ||  || — || October 25, 1992 || Uenohara || N. Kawasato || NYS || align=right | 2.8 km || 
|-id=544 bgcolor=#fefefe
| 11544 ||  || — || October 26, 1992 || Kiyosato || S. Otomo || — || align=right | 4.8 km || 
|-id=545 bgcolor=#fefefe
| 11545 Hashimoto ||  ||  || October 26, 1992 || Kitami || K. Endate, K. Watanabe || — || align=right | 2.7 km || 
|-id=546 bgcolor=#fefefe
| 11546 Miyoshimachi ||  ||  || October 28, 1992 || Kitami || M. Yanai, K. Watanabe || — || align=right | 4.7 km || 
|-id=547 bgcolor=#fefefe
| 11547 Griesser ||  ||  || October 31, 1992 || Tautenburg Observatory || F. Börngen || NYS || align=right | 2.1 km || 
|-id=548 bgcolor=#fefefe
| 11548 Jerrylewis ||  ||  || November 25, 1992 || Palomar || C. S. Shoemaker, D. H. Levy || PHO || align=right | 6.1 km || 
|-id=549 bgcolor=#E9E9E9
| 11549 || 1992 YY || — || December 25, 1992 || Yakiimo || A. Natori, T. Urata || — || align=right | 11 km || 
|-id=550 bgcolor=#E9E9E9
| 11550 || 1993 BN || — || January 20, 1993 || Oohira || T. Urata || — || align=right | 5.4 km || 
|-id=551 bgcolor=#E9E9E9
| 11551 ||  || — || January 21, 1993 || Oohira || T. Urata || — || align=right | 4.7 km || 
|-id=552 bgcolor=#C2FFFF
| 11552 Boucolion ||  ||  || January 27, 1993 || Caussols || E. W. Elst || L5 || align=right | 51 km || 
|-id=553 bgcolor=#E9E9E9
| 11553 Scheria ||  ||  || January 27, 1993 || Caussols || E. W. Elst || — || align=right | 5.4 km || 
|-id=554 bgcolor=#C2FFFF
| 11554 Asios ||  ||  || January 22, 1993 || La Silla || E. W. Elst || L5 || align=right | 42 km || 
|-id=555 bgcolor=#E9E9E9
| 11555 ||  || — || February 15, 1993 || Kushiro || S. Ueda, H. Kaneda || EUN || align=right | 5.2 km || 
|-id=556 bgcolor=#E9E9E9
| 11556 || 1993 DV || — || February 21, 1993 || Kushiro || S. Ueda, H. Kaneda || — || align=right | 3.9 km || 
|-id=557 bgcolor=#E9E9E9
| 11557 ||  || — || March 17, 1993 || La Silla || UESAC || — || align=right | 3.8 km || 
|-id=558 bgcolor=#E9E9E9
| 11558 ||  || — || March 17, 1993 || La Silla || UESAC || AGN || align=right | 4.0 km || 
|-id=559 bgcolor=#E9E9E9
| 11559 ||  || — || March 21, 1993 || La Silla || UESAC || — || align=right | 4.9 km || 
|-id=560 bgcolor=#E9E9E9
| 11560 ||  || — || March 21, 1993 || La Silla || UESAC || HEN || align=right | 3.5 km || 
|-id=561 bgcolor=#E9E9E9
| 11561 ||  || — || March 21, 1993 || La Silla || UESAC || HOF || align=right | 7.8 km || 
|-id=562 bgcolor=#E9E9E9
| 11562 ||  || — || March 19, 1993 || La Silla || UESAC || — || align=right | 10 km || 
|-id=563 bgcolor=#E9E9E9
| 11563 ||  || — || March 19, 1993 || La Silla || UESAC || — || align=right | 7.3 km || 
|-id=564 bgcolor=#fefefe
| 11564 ||  || — || March 19, 1993 || La Silla || UESAC || FLO || align=right | 5.0 km || 
|-id=565 bgcolor=#E9E9E9
| 11565 ||  || — || March 19, 1993 || La Silla || UESAC || — || align=right | 4.7 km || 
|-id=566 bgcolor=#E9E9E9
| 11566 ||  || — || March 17, 1993 || La Silla || UESAC || — || align=right | 6.6 km || 
|-id=567 bgcolor=#E9E9E9
| 11567 ||  || — || March 19, 1993 || La Silla || UESAC || HOF || align=right | 14 km || 
|-id=568 bgcolor=#d6d6d6
| 11568 || 1993 GL || — || April 14, 1993 || Kiyosato || S. Otomo || KOR || align=right | 9.0 km || 
|-id=569 bgcolor=#d6d6d6
| 11569 Virgilsmith ||  ||  || May 27, 1993 || Palomar || C. S. Shoemaker, D. H. Levy || — || align=right | 24 km || 
|-id=570 bgcolor=#d6d6d6
| 11570 || 1993 LE || — || June 14, 1993 || Palomar || H. E. Holt || — || align=right | 11 km || 
|-id=571 bgcolor=#d6d6d6
| 11571 Daens ||  ||  || July 20, 1993 || La Silla || E. W. Elst || — || align=right | 6.0 km || 
|-id=572 bgcolor=#fefefe
| 11572 Schindler ||  ||  || September 15, 1993 || La Silla || E. W. Elst || MAS || align=right | 2.6 km || 
|-id=573 bgcolor=#d6d6d6
| 11573 Helmholtz ||  ||  || September 20, 1993 || Tautenburg Observatory || F. Börngen, L. D. Schmadel || 2:1J || align=right | 12 km || 
|-id=574 bgcolor=#fefefe
| 11574 d'Alviella ||  ||  || January 16, 1994 || Caussols || E. W. Elst || — || align=right | 6.5 km || 
|-id=575 bgcolor=#fefefe
| 11575 Claudio ||  ||  || January 31, 1994 || Farra d'Isonzo || Farra d'Isonzo || V || align=right | 3.8 km || 
|-id=576 bgcolor=#fefefe
| 11576 || 1994 CL || — || February 3, 1994 || Ōizumi || T. Kobayashi || — || align=right | 8.6 km || 
|-id=577 bgcolor=#fefefe
| 11577 Einasto ||  ||  || February 8, 1994 || La Silla || E. W. Elst || — || align=right | 5.0 km || 
|-id=578 bgcolor=#fefefe
| 11578 Cimabue || 1994 EB ||  || March 4, 1994 || Colleverde || V. S. Casulli || V || align=right | 3.7 km || 
|-id=579 bgcolor=#E9E9E9
| 11579 Tsujitsuka || 1994 JN ||  || May 6, 1994 || Kitami || K. Endate, K. Watanabe || — || align=right | 5.2 km || 
|-id=580 bgcolor=#fefefe
| 11580 Bautzen ||  ||  || May 3, 1994 || Kitt Peak || Spacewatch || — || align=right | 7.4 km || 
|-id=581 bgcolor=#d6d6d6
| 11581 Philipdejager ||  ||  || August 10, 1994 || La Silla || E. W. Elst || EOS || align=right | 6.0 km || 
|-id=582 bgcolor=#d6d6d6
| 11582 Bleuler ||  ||  || August 10, 1994 || La Silla || E. W. Elst || KOR || align=right | 5.8 km || 
|-id=583 bgcolor=#d6d6d6
| 11583 Breuer ||  ||  || August 12, 1994 || La Silla || E. W. Elst || — || align=right | 3.5 km || 
|-id=584 bgcolor=#d6d6d6
| 11584 Ferenczi ||  ||  || August 10, 1994 || La Silla || E. W. Elst || EOS || align=right | 6.0 km || 
|-id=585 bgcolor=#d6d6d6
| 11585 Orlandelassus ||  ||  || September 3, 1994 || La Silla || E. W. Elst || KOR || align=right | 6.3 km || 
|-id=586 bgcolor=#d6d6d6
| 11586 ||  || — || October 31, 1994 || Kushiro || S. Ueda, H. Kaneda || EOS || align=right | 8.8 km || 
|-id=587 bgcolor=#d6d6d6
| 11587 ||  || — || October 31, 1994 || Kushiro || S. Ueda, H. Kaneda || — || align=right | 14 km || 
|-id=588 bgcolor=#d6d6d6
| 11588 Gottfriedkeller ||  ||  || October 28, 1994 || Tautenburg Observatory || F. Börngen || HYG || align=right | 9.8 km || 
|-id=589 bgcolor=#d6d6d6
| 11589 || 1994 WG || — || November 25, 1994 || Ōizumi || T. Kobayashi || 7:4 || align=right | 17 km || 
|-id=590 bgcolor=#d6d6d6
| 11590 ||  || — || November 28, 1994 || Kushiro || S. Ueda, H. Kaneda || — || align=right | 15 km || 
|-id=591 bgcolor=#fefefe
| 11591 || 1995 FV || — || March 28, 1995 || Ōizumi || T. Kobayashi || FLO || align=right | 2.8 km || 
|-id=592 bgcolor=#fefefe
| 11592 Clintkelly ||  ||  || March 23, 1995 || Kitt Peak || Spacewatch || FLO || align=right | 2.0 km || 
|-id=593 bgcolor=#fefefe
| 11593 Uchikawa || 1995 HK ||  || April 20, 1995 || Kitami || K. Endate, K. Watanabe || — || align=right | 4.2 km || 
|-id=594 bgcolor=#fefefe
| 11594 || 1995 HP || — || April 27, 1995 || Kushiro || S. Ueda, H. Kaneda || NYS || align=right | 2.9 km || 
|-id=595 bgcolor=#fefefe
| 11595 Monsummano || 1995 KN ||  || May 23, 1995 || San Marcello || A. Boattini, L. Tesi || FLO || align=right | 3.2 km || 
|-id=596 bgcolor=#fefefe
| 11596 Francetic ||  ||  || May 26, 1995 || Catalina Station || T. B. Spahr || — || align=right | 6.7 km || 
|-id=597 bgcolor=#fefefe
| 11597 ||  || — || May 31, 1995 || Siding Spring || R. H. McNaught || PHO || align=right | 5.8 km || 
|-id=598 bgcolor=#fefefe
| 11598 Kubík || 1995 OJ ||  || July 22, 1995 || Ondřejov || L. Kotková || NYS || align=right | 2.5 km || 
|-id=599 bgcolor=#fefefe
| 11599 || 1995 QR || — || August 16, 1995 || Nachi-Katsuura || Y. Shimizu, T. Urata || NYS || align=right | 3.3 km || 
|-id=600 bgcolor=#E9E9E9
| 11600 Cipolla ||  ||  || September 26, 1995 || Stroncone || Santa Lucia Obs. || — || align=right | 5.7 km || 
|}

11601–11700 

|-bgcolor=#E9E9E9
| 11601 ||  || — || September 28, 1995 || Church Stretton || S. P. Laurie || MAR || align=right | 5.2 km || 
|-id=602 bgcolor=#E9E9E9
| 11602 Miryang ||  ||  || September 28, 1995 || Socorro || R. Weber || ADE || align=right | 8.3 km || 
|-id=603 bgcolor=#E9E9E9
| 11603 || 1995 TF || — || October 5, 1995 || Kleť || Z. Moravec || — || align=right | 4.4 km || 
|-id=604 bgcolor=#d6d6d6
| 11604 Novigrad ||  ||  || October 21, 1995 || Višnjan Observatory || K. Korlević, V. Brcic || EOS || align=right | 7.7 km || 
|-id=605 bgcolor=#E9E9E9
| 11605 Ranfagni ||  ||  || October 19, 1995 || San Marcello || L. Tesi, A. Boattini || — || align=right | 8.0 km || 
|-id=606 bgcolor=#fefefe
| 11606 Almary ||  ||  || October 19, 1995 || Mauna Kea || D. J. Tholen || — || align=right | 1.1 km || 
|-id=607 bgcolor=#d6d6d6
| 11607 ||  || — || November 16, 1995 || Chichibu || N. Satō, T. Urata || — || align=right | 16 km || 
|-id=608 bgcolor=#E9E9E9
| 11608 ||  || — || November 18, 1995 || Nachi-Katsuura || Y. Shimizu, T. Urata || EUN || align=right | 4.0 km || 
|-id=609 bgcolor=#d6d6d6
| 11609 || 1995 XT || — || December 12, 1995 || Ōizumi || T. Kobayashi || THM || align=right | 12 km || 
|-id=610 bgcolor=#d6d6d6
| 11610 ||  || — || December 15, 1995 || Ōizumi || T. Kobayashi || — || align=right | 11 km || 
|-id=611 bgcolor=#d6d6d6
| 11611 || 1995 YQ || — || December 18, 1995 || Haleakalā || NEAT || EOS || align=right | 7.7 km || 
|-id=612 bgcolor=#d6d6d6
| 11612 Obu ||  ||  || December 21, 1995 || Kuma Kogen || A. Nakamura || — || align=right | 6.5 km || 
|-id=613 bgcolor=#d6d6d6
| 11613 ||  || — || December 23, 1995 || Nachi-Katsuura || Y. Shimizu, T. Urata || EOS || align=right | 9.8 km || 
|-id=614 bgcolor=#d6d6d6
| 11614 Istropolitana ||  ||  || January 14, 1996 || Modra || A. Galád, A. Pravda || EOS || align=right | 6.8 km || 
|-id=615 bgcolor=#d6d6d6
| 11615 Naoya ||  ||  || January 13, 1996 || Kitami || K. Endate, K. Watanabe || — || align=right | 13 km || 
|-id=616 bgcolor=#d6d6d6
| 11616 ||  || — || January 26, 1996 || Ōizumi || T. Kobayashi || 7:4 || align=right | 12 km || 
|-id=617 bgcolor=#d6d6d6
| 11617 ||  || — || February 12, 1996 || Kushiro || S. Ueda, H. Kaneda || — || align=right | 8.4 km || 
|-id=618 bgcolor=#d6d6d6
| 11618 ||  || — || March 15, 1996 || Haleakalā || NEAT || URS || align=right | 14 km || 
|-id=619 bgcolor=#E9E9E9
| 11619 ||  || — || April 13, 1996 || Kushiro || S. Ueda, H. Kaneda || — || align=right | 6.3 km || 
|-id=620 bgcolor=#E9E9E9
| 11620 Susanagordon ||  ||  || July 23, 1996 || Campo Imperatore || A. Boattini, A. Di Paola || — || align=right | 8.0 km || 
|-id=621 bgcolor=#d6d6d6
| 11621 Duccio ||  ||  || August 15, 1996 || Montelupo || M. Tombelli, G. Forti || — || align=right | 13 km || 
|-id=622 bgcolor=#E9E9E9
| 11622 Samuele ||  ||  || September 9, 1996 || San Marcello || A. Boattini, L. Tesi || — || align=right | 9.7 km || 
|-id=623 bgcolor=#fefefe
| 11623 Kagekatu ||  ||  || October 8, 1996 || Nanyo || T. Okuni || — || align=right | 3.6 km || 
|-id=624 bgcolor=#fefefe
| 11624 || 1996 UF || — || October 16, 1996 || Ōizumi || T. Kobayashi || — || align=right | 3.5 km || 
|-id=625 bgcolor=#d6d6d6
| 11625 Francelinda ||  ||  || October 20, 1996 || San Marcello || L. Tesi, G. Cattani || — || align=right | 8.3 km || 
|-id=626 bgcolor=#fefefe
| 11626 Church Stretton ||  ||  || November 8, 1996 || Church Stretton || S. P. Laurie || FLO || align=right | 2.9 km || 
|-id=627 bgcolor=#fefefe
| 11627 ||  || — || November 13, 1996 || Ōizumi || T. Kobayashi || — || align=right | 4.0 km || 
|-id=628 bgcolor=#fefefe
| 11628 Katuhikoikeda ||  ||  || November 13, 1996 || Moriyama || Y. Ikari || — || align=right | 4.6 km || 
|-id=629 bgcolor=#fefefe
| 11629 ||  || — || November 7, 1996 || Kushiro || S. Ueda, H. Kaneda || — || align=right | 3.3 km || 
|-id=630 bgcolor=#fefefe
| 11630 ||  || — || November 7, 1996 || Xinglong || SCAP || — || align=right | 4.1 km || 
|-id=631 bgcolor=#fefefe
| 11631 ||  || — || December 2, 1996 || Ōizumi || T. Kobayashi || V || align=right | 3.5 km || 
|-id=632 bgcolor=#fefefe
| 11632 ||  || — || December 3, 1996 || Ōizumi || T. Kobayashi || NYS || align=right | 3.6 km || 
|-id=633 bgcolor=#E9E9E9
| 11633 ||  || — || December 2, 1996 || Uccle || T. Pauwels || DOR || align=right | 12 km || 
|-id=634 bgcolor=#fefefe
| 11634 ||  || — || December 12, 1996 || Nachi-Katsuura || Y. Shimizu, T. Urata || — || align=right | 2.3 km || 
|-id=635 bgcolor=#fefefe
| 11635 ||  || — || December 6, 1996 || Kushiro || S. Ueda, H. Kaneda || FLO || align=right | 3.8 km || 
|-id=636 bgcolor=#E9E9E9
| 11636 Pezinok ||  ||  || December 27, 1996 || Modra || A. Galád, A. Pravda || — || align=right | 2.6 km || 
|-id=637 bgcolor=#E9E9E9
| 11637 Yangjiachi ||  ||  || December 24, 1996 || Xinglong || SCAP || — || align=right | 6.0 km || 
|-id=638 bgcolor=#fefefe
| 11638 || 1997 AH || — || January 2, 1997 || Ōizumi || T. Kobayashi || — || align=right | 7.4 km || 
|-id=639 bgcolor=#E9E9E9
| 11639 ||  || — || January 6, 1997 || Ōizumi || T. Kobayashi || NEM || align=right | 9.5 km || 
|-id=640 bgcolor=#fefefe
| 11640 ||  || — || January 6, 1997 || Ōizumi || T. Kobayashi || V || align=right | 3.4 km || 
|-id=641 bgcolor=#E9E9E9
| 11641 ||  || — || January 7, 1997 || Nachi-Katsuura || Y. Shimizu, T. Urata || — || align=right | 5.3 km || 
|-id=642 bgcolor=#E9E9E9
| 11642 ||  || — || January 13, 1997 || Nachi-Katsuura || Y. Shimizu, T. Urata || — || align=right | 4.6 km || 
|-id=643 bgcolor=#fefefe
| 11643 ||  || — || January 8, 1997 || Xinglong || SCAP || — || align=right | 3.9 km || 
|-id=644 bgcolor=#d6d6d6
| 11644 ||  || — || January 29, 1997 || Ōizumi || T. Kobayashi || — || align=right | 13 km || 
|-id=645 bgcolor=#E9E9E9
| 11645 ||  || — || January 29, 1997 || Ōizumi || T. Kobayashi || — || align=right | 8.9 km || 
|-id=646 bgcolor=#E9E9E9
| 11646 ||  || — || January 29, 1997 || Ōizumi || T. Kobayashi || — || align=right | 3.3 km || 
|-id=647 bgcolor=#d6d6d6
| 11647 ||  || — || January 31, 1997 || Ōizumi || T. Kobayashi || — || align=right | 5.9 km || 
|-id=648 bgcolor=#d6d6d6
| 11648 ||  || — || January 31, 1997 || Ōizumi || T. Kobayashi || KOR || align=right | 6.7 km || 
|-id=649 bgcolor=#fefefe
| 11649 ||  || — || January 29, 1997 || Nachi-Katsuura || Y. Shimizu, T. Urata || FLO || align=right | 4.3 km || 
|-id=650 bgcolor=#fefefe
| 11650 || 1997 CN || — || February 1, 1997 || Ōizumi || T. Kobayashi || — || align=right | 5.0 km || 
|-id=651 bgcolor=#E9E9E9
| 11651 || 1997 CY || — || February 1, 1997 || Ōizumi || T. Kobayashi || — || align=right | 5.6 km || 
|-id=652 bgcolor=#d6d6d6
| 11652 Johnbrownlee ||  ||  || February 7, 1997 || Sormano || P. Sicoli, F. Manca || THM || align=right | 15 km || 
|-id=653 bgcolor=#d6d6d6
| 11653 ||  || — || February 12, 1997 || Ōizumi || T. Kobayashi || VER || align=right | 13 km || 
|-id=654 bgcolor=#E9E9E9
| 11654 ||  || — || February 12, 1997 || Ōizumi || T. Kobayashi || — || align=right | 3.3 km || 
|-id=655 bgcolor=#d6d6d6
| 11655 ||  || — || February 7, 1997 || Xinglong || SCAP || THM || align=right | 10 km || 
|-id=656 bgcolor=#d6d6d6
| 11656 Lipno ||  ||  || March 6, 1997 || Kleť || M. Tichý, Z. Moravec || — || align=right | 13 km || 
|-id=657 bgcolor=#fefefe
| 11657 Antonhajduk ||  ||  || March 5, 1997 || Modra || A. Galád, A. Pravda || NYS || align=right | 2.6 km || 
|-id=658 bgcolor=#d6d6d6
| 11658 ||  || — || March 1, 1997 || Kushiro || S. Ueda, H. Kaneda || — || align=right | 12 km || 
|-id=659 bgcolor=#E9E9E9
| 11659 ||  || — || March 10, 1997 || Socorro || LINEAR || HOF || align=right | 13 km || 
|-id=660 bgcolor=#fefefe
| 11660 ||  || — || March 31, 1997 || Socorro || LINEAR || NYS || align=right | 3.5 km || 
|-id=661 bgcolor=#E9E9E9
| 11661 ||  || — || March 31, 1997 || Socorro || LINEAR || GEF || align=right | 5.3 km || 
|-id=662 bgcolor=#d6d6d6
| 11662 ||  || — || April 6, 1997 || Socorro || LINEAR || — || align=right | 9.9 km || 
|-id=663 bgcolor=#C2FFFF
| 11663 ||  || — || April 7, 1997 || Socorro || LINEAR || L5 || align=right | 31 km || 
|-id=664 bgcolor=#d6d6d6
| 11664 Kashiwagi ||  ||  || April 4, 1997 || Kitami || K. Endate, K. Watanabe || THM || align=right | 12 km || 
|-id=665 bgcolor=#d6d6d6
| 11665 Dirichlet ||  ||  || April 14, 1997 || Prescott || P. G. Comba || 2:1J || align=right | 6.8 km || 
|-id=666 bgcolor=#fefefe
| 11666 Bracker ||  ||  || June 29, 1997 || Kitt Peak || Spacewatch || — || align=right | 4.4 km || 
|-id=667 bgcolor=#fefefe
| 11667 Testa ||  ||  || October 19, 1997 || San Marcello || L. Tesi, A. Boattini || FLO || align=right | 2.5 km || 
|-id=668 bgcolor=#C2FFFF
| 11668 Balios ||  ||  || November 3, 1997 || Ondřejov || P. Pravec || L4 || align=right | 25 km || 
|-id=669 bgcolor=#fefefe
| 11669 Pascalscholl ||  ||  || December 7, 1997 || Caussols || ODAS || — || align=right | 6.1 km || 
|-id=670 bgcolor=#d6d6d6
| 11670 Fountain ||  ||  || January 6, 1998 || Anderson Mesa || M. W. Buie || THM || align=right | 13 km || 
|-id=671 bgcolor=#fefefe
| 11671 ||  || — || January 21, 1998 || Nachi-Katsuura || Y. Shimizu, T. Urata || — || align=right | 3.3 km || 
|-id=672 bgcolor=#fefefe
| 11672 Cuney ||  ||  || January 24, 1998 || Haleakalā || NEAT || — || align=right | 5.7 km || 
|-id=673 bgcolor=#fefefe
| 11673 Baur ||  ||  || January 26, 1998 || Farra d'Isonzo || Farra d'Isonzo || — || align=right | 3.6 km || 
|-id=674 bgcolor=#fefefe
| 11674 ||  || — || January 28, 1998 || Ōizumi || T. Kobayashi || — || align=right | 3.8 km || 
|-id=675 bgcolor=#fefefe
| 11675 Billboyle ||  ||  || February 15, 1998 || Bédoin || P. Antonini || NYS || align=right | 4.8 km || 
|-id=676 bgcolor=#fefefe
| 11676 ||  || — || February 6, 1998 || Gekko || T. Kagawa || NYS || align=right | 5.4 km || 
|-id=677 bgcolor=#fefefe
| 11677 ||  || — || February 22, 1998 || Haleakalā || NEAT || — || align=right | 3.8 km || 
|-id=678 bgcolor=#fefefe
| 11678 Brevard ||  ||  || February 25, 1998 || Cocoa || I. P. Griffin || — || align=right | 3.7 km || 
|-id=679 bgcolor=#fefefe
| 11679 Brucebaker ||  ||  || February 25, 1998 || Haleakalā || NEAT || — || align=right | 3.0 km || 
|-id=680 bgcolor=#E9E9E9
| 11680 ||  || — || February 24, 1998 || Haleakalā || NEAT || — || align=right | 4.3 km || 
|-id=681 bgcolor=#fefefe
| 11681 Ortner ||  ||  || March 1, 1998 || Caussols || ODAS || — || align=right | 3.9 km || 
|-id=682 bgcolor=#fefefe
| 11682 Shiwaku ||  ||  || March 3, 1998 || Yatsuka || H. Abe || NYS || align=right | 4.8 km || 
|-id=683 bgcolor=#E9E9E9
| 11683 ||  || — || March 22, 1998 || Nachi-Katsuura || Y. Shimizu, T. Urata || — || align=right | 13 km || 
|-id=684 bgcolor=#E9E9E9
| 11684 ||  || — || March 24, 1998 || Haleakalā || NEAT || — || align=right | 12 km || 
|-id=685 bgcolor=#fefefe
| 11685 Adamcurry ||  ||  || March 20, 1998 || Socorro || LINEAR || — || align=right | 2.3 km || 
|-id=686 bgcolor=#fefefe
| 11686 ||  || — || March 20, 1998 || Socorro || LINEAR || FLO || align=right | 3.1 km || 
|-id=687 bgcolor=#E9E9E9
| 11687 ||  || — || March 20, 1998 || Socorro || LINEAR || — || align=right | 4.9 km || 
|-id=688 bgcolor=#fefefe
| 11688 Amandugan ||  ||  || March 20, 1998 || Socorro || LINEAR || — || align=right | 3.3 km || 
|-id=689 bgcolor=#E9E9E9
| 11689 ||  || — || March 20, 1998 || Socorro || LINEAR || MAR || align=right | 4.1 km || 
|-id=690 bgcolor=#fefefe
| 11690 Carodulaney ||  ||  || March 20, 1998 || Socorro || LINEAR || — || align=right | 3.7 km || 
|-id=691 bgcolor=#fefefe
| 11691 Easterwood ||  ||  || March 20, 1998 || Socorro || LINEAR || — || align=right | 2.8 km || 
|-id=692 bgcolor=#d6d6d6
| 11692 ||  || — || March 20, 1998 || Socorro || LINEAR || — || align=right | 11 km || 
|-id=693 bgcolor=#fefefe
| 11693 Grantelliott ||  ||  || March 20, 1998 || Socorro || LINEAR || — || align=right | 7.6 km || 
|-id=694 bgcolor=#fefefe
| 11694 Esterhuysen ||  ||  || March 20, 1998 || Socorro || LINEAR || FLO || align=right | 2.5 km || 
|-id=695 bgcolor=#fefefe
| 11695 Mattei ||  ||  || March 22, 1998 || Anderson Mesa || LONEOS || — || align=right | 3.3 km || 
|-id=696 bgcolor=#fefefe
| 11696 Capen ||  ||  || March 22, 1998 || Anderson Mesa || LONEOS || — || align=right | 4.0 km || 
|-id=697 bgcolor=#fefefe
| 11697 Estrella ||  ||  || March 31, 1998 || Socorro || LINEAR || V || align=right | 2.7 km || 
|-id=698 bgcolor=#fefefe
| 11698 Fichtelman ||  ||  || March 31, 1998 || Socorro || LINEAR || — || align=right | 3.5 km || 
|-id=699 bgcolor=#fefefe
| 11699 ||  || — || March 31, 1998 || Socorro || LINEAR || V || align=right | 6.4 km || 
|-id=700 bgcolor=#d6d6d6
| 11700 ||  || — || March 31, 1998 || Socorro || LINEAR || — || align=right | 13 km || 
|}

11701–11800 

|-bgcolor=#E9E9E9
| 11701 ||  || — || March 31, 1998 || Socorro || LINEAR || — || align=right | 6.4 km || 
|-id=702 bgcolor=#fefefe
| 11702 Mifischer ||  ||  || March 31, 1998 || Socorro || LINEAR || FLO || align=right | 3.1 km || 
|-id=703 bgcolor=#E9E9E9
| 11703 Glassman ||  ||  || March 20, 1998 || Socorro || LINEAR || — || align=right | 4.8 km || 
|-id=704 bgcolor=#fefefe
| 11704 Gorin ||  ||  || March 22, 1998 || Socorro || LINEAR || V || align=right | 2.7 km || 
|-id=705 bgcolor=#E9E9E9
| 11705 ||  || — || April 2, 1998 || Socorro || LINEAR || EUN || align=right | 9.6 km || 
|-id=706 bgcolor=#d6d6d6
| 11706 Rijeka ||  ||  || April 20, 1998 || Višnjan Observatory || K. Korlević, M. Dusić || — || align=right | 8.3 km || 
|-id=707 bgcolor=#fefefe
| 11707 Grigery ||  ||  || April 18, 1998 || Socorro || LINEAR || FLO || align=right | 2.8 km || 
|-id=708 bgcolor=#fefefe
| 11708 ||  || — || April 18, 1998 || Socorro || LINEAR || — || align=right | 2.1 km || 
|-id=709 bgcolor=#E9E9E9
| 11709 Eudoxos ||  ||  || April 27, 1998 || Prescott || P. G. Comba || — || align=right | 4.5 km || 
|-id=710 bgcolor=#fefefe
| 11710 Nataliehale ||  ||  || April 20, 1998 || Socorro || LINEAR || — || align=right | 6.7 km || 
|-id=711 bgcolor=#fefefe
| 11711 Urquiza ||  ||  || April 25, 1998 || Anderson Mesa || LONEOS || — || align=right | 3.8 km || 
|-id=712 bgcolor=#E9E9E9
| 11712 Kemcook ||  ||  || April 25, 1998 || Anderson Mesa || LONEOS || — || align=right | 4.7 km || 
|-id=713 bgcolor=#E9E9E9
| 11713 Stubbs ||  ||  || April 25, 1998 || Anderson Mesa || LONEOS || — || align=right | 11 km || 
|-id=714 bgcolor=#E9E9E9
| 11714 Mikebrown ||  ||  || April 28, 1998 || Anderson Mesa || LONEOS || — || align=right | 4.5 km || 
|-id=715 bgcolor=#fefefe
| 11715 Harperclark ||  ||  || April 21, 1998 || Socorro || LINEAR || — || align=right | 4.1 km || 
|-id=716 bgcolor=#E9E9E9
| 11716 Amahartman ||  ||  || April 21, 1998 || Socorro || LINEAR || — || align=right | 4.8 km || 
|-id=717 bgcolor=#d6d6d6
| 11717 ||  || — || April 21, 1998 || Socorro || LINEAR || THM || align=right | 15 km || 
|-id=718 bgcolor=#E9E9E9
| 11718 Hayward ||  ||  || April 21, 1998 || Socorro || LINEAR || — || align=right | 4.1 km || 
|-id=719 bgcolor=#E9E9E9
| 11719 Hicklen ||  ||  || April 21, 1998 || Socorro || LINEAR || — || align=right | 4.9 km || 
|-id=720 bgcolor=#E9E9E9
| 11720 Horodyskyj ||  ||  || April 21, 1998 || Socorro || LINEAR || — || align=right | 4.2 km || 
|-id=721 bgcolor=#E9E9E9
| 11721 ||  || — || April 21, 1998 || Socorro || LINEAR || GEF || align=right | 5.0 km || 
|-id=722 bgcolor=#d6d6d6
| 11722 ||  || — || April 23, 1998 || Socorro || LINEAR || EOS || align=right | 8.0 km || 
|-id=723 bgcolor=#fefefe
| 11723 ||  || — || April 23, 1998 || Socorro || LINEAR || — || align=right | 4.2 km || 
|-id=724 bgcolor=#fefefe
| 11724 Ronaldhsu ||  ||  || April 21, 1998 || Socorro || LINEAR || — || align=right | 3.6 km || 
|-id=725 bgcolor=#E9E9E9
| 11725 Victoriahsu ||  ||  || April 21, 1998 || Socorro || LINEAR || — || align=right | 3.6 km || 
|-id=726 bgcolor=#d6d6d6
| 11726 Edgerton || 1998 JA ||  || May 1, 1998 || Lime Creek || R. Linderholm || — || align=right | 16 km || 
|-id=727 bgcolor=#fefefe
| 11727 Sweet ||  ||  || May 1, 1998 || Haleakalā || NEAT || — || align=right | 4.3 km || 
|-id=728 bgcolor=#d6d6d6
| 11728 Einer ||  ||  || May 1, 1998 || Haleakalā || NEAT || KAR || align=right | 5.1 km || 
|-id=729 bgcolor=#d6d6d6
| 11729 ||  || — || May 22, 1998 || Socorro || LINEAR || THM || align=right | 17 km || 
|-id=730 bgcolor=#fefefe
| 11730 Yanhua ||  ||  || May 22, 1998 || Socorro || LINEAR || — || align=right | 3.1 km || 
|-id=731 bgcolor=#d6d6d6
| 11731 ||  || — || May 22, 1998 || Socorro || LINEAR || — || align=right | 15 km || 
|-id=732 bgcolor=#d6d6d6
| 11732 ||  || — || May 23, 1998 || Socorro || LINEAR || EOS || align=right | 11 km || 
|-id=733 bgcolor=#d6d6d6
| 11733 ||  || — || May 23, 1998 || Socorro || LINEAR || — || align=right | 8.8 km || 
|-id=734 bgcolor=#E9E9E9
| 11734 ||  || — || May 23, 1998 || Socorro || LINEAR || EUN || align=right | 7.7 km || 
|-id=735 bgcolor=#d6d6d6
| 11735 ||  || — || May 22, 1998 || Socorro || LINEAR || — || align=right | 4.6 km || 
|-id=736 bgcolor=#fefefe
| 11736 Viktorfischl ||  ||  || August 19, 1998 || Ondřejov || L. Kotková || NYS || align=right | 4.0 km || 
|-id=737 bgcolor=#fefefe
| 11737 ||  || — || August 17, 1998 || Socorro || LINEAR || slow || align=right | 4.9 km || 
|-id=738 bgcolor=#d6d6d6
| 11738 ||  || — || September 14, 1998 || Socorro || LINEAR || THM || align=right | 18 km || 
|-id=739 bgcolor=#d6d6d6
| 11739 Baton Rouge ||  ||  || September 25, 1998 || Baton Rouge || W. R. Cooney Jr., M. Collier || 3:2 || align=right | 17 km || 
|-id=740 bgcolor=#d6d6d6
| 11740 Georgesmith ||  ||  || October 22, 1998 || Caussols || ODAS || KOR || align=right | 5.9 km || 
|-id=741 bgcolor=#d6d6d6
| 11741 ||  || — || January 10, 1999 || Ōizumi || T. Kobayashi || KOR || align=right | 6.0 km || 
|-id=742 bgcolor=#E9E9E9
| 11742 ||  || — || May 7, 1999 || Nachi-Katsuura || Y. Shimizu, T. Urata || HOF || align=right | 11 km || 
|-id=743 bgcolor=#fefefe
| 11743 Jachowski ||  ||  || May 13, 1999 || Socorro || LINEAR || NYS || align=right | 2.8 km || 
|-id=744 bgcolor=#fefefe
| 11744 ||  || — || July 9, 1999 || Oohira || T. Urata || — || align=right | 2.9 km || 
|-id=745 bgcolor=#E9E9E9
| 11745 ||  || — || July 13, 1999 || Socorro || LINEAR || — || align=right | 8.2 km || 
|-id=746 bgcolor=#fefefe
| 11746 Thomjansen ||  ||  || July 13, 1999 || Socorro || LINEAR || — || align=right | 3.0 km || 
|-id=747 bgcolor=#E9E9E9
| 11747 ||  || — || July 13, 1999 || Socorro || LINEAR || — || align=right | 5.9 km || 
|-id=748 bgcolor=#fefefe
| 11748 ||  || — || July 13, 1999 || Socorro || LINEAR || — || align=right | 4.4 km || 
|-id=749 bgcolor=#d6d6d6
| 11749 ||  || — || July 13, 1999 || Socorro || LINEAR || — || align=right | 11 km || 
|-id=750 bgcolor=#d6d6d6
| 11750 ||  || — || July 14, 1999 || Socorro || LINEAR || 3:2 || align=right | 18 km || 
|-id=751 bgcolor=#fefefe
| 11751 ||  || — || July 14, 1999 || Socorro || LINEAR || — || align=right | 5.6 km || 
|-id=752 bgcolor=#E9E9E9
| 11752 Masatakesagai ||  ||  || July 23, 1999 || Nanyo || T. Okuni || — || align=right | 4.9 km || 
|-id=753 bgcolor=#d6d6d6
| 11753 Geoffburbidge || 2064 P-L ||  || September 24, 1960 || Palomar || PLS || HYG || align=right | 7.9 km || 
|-id=754 bgcolor=#d6d6d6
| 11754 Herbig || 2560 P-L ||  || September 24, 1960 || Palomar || PLS || — || align=right | 9.5 km || 
|-id=755 bgcolor=#fefefe
| 11755 Paczynski || 2691 P-L ||  || September 24, 1960 || Palomar || PLS || NYS || align=right | 2.9 km || 
|-id=756 bgcolor=#fefefe
| 11756 Geneparker || 2779 P-L ||  || September 24, 1960 || Palomar || PLS || — || align=right | 3.3 km || 
|-id=757 bgcolor=#d6d6d6
| 11757 Salpeter || 2799 P-L ||  || September 24, 1960 || Palomar || PLS || EUP || align=right | 6.7 km || 
|-id=758 bgcolor=#d6d6d6
| 11758 Sargent || 4035 P-L ||  || September 24, 1960 || Palomar || PLS || HYG || align=right | 8.9 km || 
|-id=759 bgcolor=#fefefe
| 11759 Sunyaev || 4075 P-L ||  || September 24, 1960 || Palomar || PLS || — || align=right | 2.3 km || 
|-id=760 bgcolor=#d6d6d6
| 11760 Auwers || 4090 P-L ||  || September 24, 1960 || Palomar || PLS || — || align=right | 5.7 km || 
|-id=761 bgcolor=#d6d6d6
| 11761 Davidgill || 4868 P-L ||  || September 24, 1960 || Palomar || PLS || — || align=right | 6.9 km || 
|-id=762 bgcolor=#d6d6d6
| 11762 Vogel || 6044 P-L ||  || September 24, 1960 || Palomar || PLS || — || align=right | 5.9 km || 
|-id=763 bgcolor=#d6d6d6
| 11763 Deslandres || 6303 P-L ||  || September 24, 1960 || Palomar || PLS || KOR || align=right | 4.6 km || 
|-id=764 bgcolor=#fefefe
| 11764 Benbaillaud || 6531 P-L ||  || September 24, 1960 || Palomar || PLS || — || align=right | 3.1 km || 
|-id=765 bgcolor=#fefefe
| 11765 Alfredfowler || 9057 P-L ||  || October 17, 1960 || Palomar || PLS || FLO || align=right | 3.8 km || 
|-id=766 bgcolor=#d6d6d6
| 11766 Fredseares || 9073 P-L ||  || October 17, 1960 || Palomar || PLS || HYG || align=right | 14 km || 
|-id=767 bgcolor=#fefefe
| 11767 Milne || 3224 T-1 ||  || March 26, 1971 || Palomar || PLS || — || align=right | 2.7 km || 
|-id=768 bgcolor=#d6d6d6
| 11768 Merrill || 4107 T-1 ||  || March 26, 1971 || Palomar || PLS || VER || align=right | 12 km || 
|-id=769 bgcolor=#E9E9E9
| 11769 Alfredjoy || 2199 T-2 ||  || September 29, 1973 || Palomar || PLS || — || align=right | 2.8 km || 
|-id=770 bgcolor=#d6d6d6
| 11770 Rudominkowski || 3163 T-2 ||  || September 30, 1973 || Palomar || PLS || — || align=right | 11 km || 
|-id=771 bgcolor=#d6d6d6
| 11771 Maestlin || 4136 T-2 ||  || September 29, 1973 || Palomar || PLS || — || align=right | 7.6 km || 
|-id=772 bgcolor=#E9E9E9
| 11772 Jacoblemaire || 4210 T-2 ||  || September 29, 1973 || Palomar || PLS || — || align=right | 4.1 km || 
|-id=773 bgcolor=#E9E9E9
| 11773 Schouten || 1021 T-3 ||  || October 17, 1977 || Palomar || PLS || — || align=right | 5.4 km || 
|-id=774 bgcolor=#d6d6d6
| 11774 Jerne || 1128 T-3 ||  || October 17, 1977 || Palomar || PLS || slow || align=right | 12 km || 
|-id=775 bgcolor=#fefefe
| 11775 Köhler || 3224 T-3 ||  || October 16, 1977 || Palomar || PLS || — || align=right | 2.8 km || 
|-id=776 bgcolor=#d6d6d6
| 11776 Milstein || 3460 T-3 ||  || October 16, 1977 || Palomar || PLS || THM || align=right | 11 km || 
|-id=777 bgcolor=#fefefe
| 11777 Hargrave || 3526 T-3 ||  || October 16, 1977 || Palomar || PLS || NYS || align=right | 2.2 km || 
|-id=778 bgcolor=#fefefe
| 11778 Kingsford Smith || 4102 T-3 ||  || October 16, 1977 || Palomar || PLS || — || align=right | 2.8 km || 
|-id=779 bgcolor=#E9E9E9
| 11779 Zernike || 4197 T-3 ||  || October 16, 1977 || Palomar || PLS || — || align=right | 4.7 km || 
|-id=780 bgcolor=#E9E9E9
| 11780 Thunder Bay || 1942 TB ||  || October 3, 1942 || Turku || L. Oterma || slow || align=right | 5.6 km || 
|-id=781 bgcolor=#fefefe
| 11781 Alexroberts || 1966 PL ||  || August 7, 1966 || Bloemfontein || Boyden Obs. || V || align=right | 3.8 km || 
|-id=782 bgcolor=#fefefe
| 11782 Nikolajivanov ||  ||  || October 8, 1969 || Nauchnij || L. I. Chernykh || NYS || align=right | 3.3 km || 
|-id=783 bgcolor=#d6d6d6
| 11783 ||  || — || October 26, 1971 || Hamburg-Bergedorf || L. Kohoutek || THM || align=right | 9.8 km || 
|-id=784 bgcolor=#d6d6d6
| 11784 ||  || — || October 26, 1971 || Hamburg-Bergedorf || L. Kohoutek || — || align=right | 12 km || 
|-id=785 bgcolor=#E9E9E9
| 11785 Migaic ||  ||  || January 2, 1973 || Nauchnij || N. S. Chernykh || — || align=right | 15 km || 
|-id=786 bgcolor=#d6d6d6
| 11786 Bakhchivandji || 1977 QW ||  || August 19, 1977 || Nauchnij || N. S. Chernykh || — || align=right | 13 km || 
|-id=787 bgcolor=#E9E9E9
| 11787 Baumanka ||  ||  || August 19, 1977 || Nauchnij || N. S. Chernykh || EUN || align=right | 8.0 km || 
|-id=788 bgcolor=#fefefe
| 11788 Nauchnyj ||  ||  || August 21, 1977 || Nauchnij || N. S. Chernykh || — || align=right | 2.7 km || 
|-id=789 bgcolor=#fefefe
| 11789 Kempowski || 1977 RK ||  || September 5, 1977 || La Silla || H.-E. Schuster || H || align=right | 2.2 km || 
|-id=790 bgcolor=#E9E9E9
| 11790 Goode || 1978 RU ||  || September 1, 1978 || Nauchnij || N. S. Chernykh || — || align=right | 5.1 km || 
|-id=791 bgcolor=#E9E9E9
| 11791 Sofiyavarzar ||  ||  || September 26, 1978 || Nauchnij || L. V. Zhuravleva || — || align=right | 4.6 km || 
|-id=792 bgcolor=#E9E9E9
| 11792 Sidorovsky ||  ||  || September 26, 1978 || Nauchnij || L. V. Zhuravleva || — || align=right | 5.9 km || 
|-id=793 bgcolor=#d6d6d6
| 11793 Chujkovia ||  ||  || October 2, 1978 || Nauchnij || L. V. Zhuravleva || EMA || align=right | 15 km || 
|-id=794 bgcolor=#d6d6d6
| 11794 Yokokebukawa ||  ||  || November 7, 1978 || Palomar || E. F. Helin, S. J. Bus || THM || align=right | 11 km || 
|-id=795 bgcolor=#d6d6d6
| 11795 Fredrikbruhn ||  ||  || August 22, 1979 || La Silla || C.-I. Lagerkvist || — || align=right | 5.8 km || 
|-id=796 bgcolor=#fefefe
| 11796 Nirenberg ||  ||  || February 21, 1980 || Nauchnij || L. G. Karachkina || — || align=right | 7.9 km || 
|-id=797 bgcolor=#E9E9E9
| 11797 Warell ||  ||  || March 16, 1980 || La Silla || C.-I. Lagerkvist || EUN || align=right | 6.1 km || 
|-id=798 bgcolor=#E9E9E9
| 11798 Davidsson ||  ||  || March 16, 1980 || La Silla || C.-I. Lagerkvist || — || align=right | 4.7 km || 
|-id=799 bgcolor=#d6d6d6
| 11799 Lantz ||  ||  || February 28, 1981 || Siding Spring || S. J. Bus || — || align=right | 12 km || 
|-id=800 bgcolor=#d6d6d6
| 11800 Carrozzo ||  ||  || February 28, 1981 || Siding Spring || S. J. Bus || EOS || align=right | 6.7 km || 
|}

11801–11900 

|-bgcolor=#d6d6d6
| 11801 Frigeri ||  ||  || March 2, 1981 || Siding Spring || S. J. Bus || EOSfast? || align=right | 8.6 km || 
|-id=802 bgcolor=#fefefe
| 11802 Ivanovski ||  ||  || March 1, 1981 || Siding Spring || S. J. Bus || — || align=right | 3.6 km || 
|-id=803 bgcolor=#d6d6d6
| 11803 Turrini ||  ||  || March 1, 1981 || Siding Spring || S. J. Bus || — || align=right | 5.8 km || 
|-id=804 bgcolor=#E9E9E9
| 11804 Zambon ||  ||  || March 1, 1981 || Siding Spring || S. J. Bus || — || align=right | 3.1 km || 
|-id=805 bgcolor=#d6d6d6
| 11805 Novaković ||  ||  || March 1, 1981 || Siding Spring || S. J. Bus || EOS || align=right | 5.3 km || 
|-id=806 bgcolor=#fefefe
| 11806 Thangjam ||  ||  || March 1, 1981 || Siding Spring || S. J. Bus || — || align=right | 2.5 km || 
|-id=807 bgcolor=#d6d6d6
| 11807 Wannberg ||  ||  || March 1, 1981 || Siding Spring || S. J. Bus || — || align=right | 5.9 km || 
|-id=808 bgcolor=#E9E9E9
| 11808 Platz ||  ||  || March 1, 1981 || Siding Spring || S. J. Bus || — || align=right | 4.6 km || 
|-id=809 bgcolor=#fefefe
| 11809 Shinnaka ||  ||  || March 2, 1981 || Siding Spring || S. J. Bus || — || align=right | 2.2 km || 
|-id=810 bgcolor=#d6d6d6
| 11810 Preusker ||  ||  || March 2, 1981 || Siding Spring || S. J. Bus || — || align=right | 7.1 km || 
|-id=811 bgcolor=#fefefe
| 11811 Martinrubin ||  ||  || March 2, 1981 || Siding Spring || S. J. Bus || — || align=right | 2.7 km || 
|-id=812 bgcolor=#d6d6d6
| 11812 Dongqiao ||  ||  || March 2, 1981 || Siding Spring || S. J. Bus || — || align=right | 6.2 km || 
|-id=813 bgcolor=#d6d6d6
| 11813 Ingorichter ||  ||  || March 3, 1981 || Siding Spring || S. J. Bus || — || align=right | 9.8 km || 
|-id=814 bgcolor=#d6d6d6
| 11814 Schwamb ||  ||  || March 2, 1981 || Siding Spring || S. J. Bus || — || align=right | 8.9 km || 
|-id=815 bgcolor=#E9E9E9
| 11815 Viikinkoski ||  ||  || March 2, 1981 || Siding Spring || S. J. Bus || — || align=right | 3.0 km || 
|-id=816 bgcolor=#E9E9E9
| 11816 Vasile ||  ||  || March 1, 1981 || Siding Spring || S. J. Bus || RAF || align=right | 3.0 km || 
|-id=817 bgcolor=#E9E9E9
| 11817 Oguri ||  ||  || March 2, 1981 || Siding Spring || S. J. Bus || — || align=right | 3.7 km || 
|-id=818 bgcolor=#d6d6d6
| 11818 Ulamec ||  ||  || March 2, 1981 || Siding Spring || S. J. Bus || — || align=right | 8.9 km || 
|-id=819 bgcolor=#d6d6d6
| 11819 Millarca ||  ||  || March 2, 1981 || Siding Spring || S. J. Bus || — || align=right | 6.6 km || 
|-id=820 bgcolor=#d6d6d6
| 11820 Mikiyasato ||  ||  || March 1, 1981 || Siding Spring || S. J. Bus || — || align=right | 5.4 km || 
|-id=821 bgcolor=#d6d6d6
| 11821 Coleman ||  ||  || March 6, 1981 || Siding Spring || S. J. Bus || EOS || align=right | 7.4 km || 
|-id=822 bgcolor=#fefefe
| 11822 || 1981 TK || — || October 6, 1981 || Kleť || Z. Vávrová || PHO || align=right | 4.6 km || 
|-id=823 bgcolor=#fefefe
| 11823 Christen || 1981 VF ||  || November 2, 1981 || Anderson Mesa || B. A. Skiff || — || align=right | 4.1 km || 
|-id=824 bgcolor=#E9E9E9
| 11824 Alpaidze ||  ||  || September 16, 1982 || Nauchnij || L. I. Chernykh || — || align=right | 4.5 km || 
|-id=825 bgcolor=#d6d6d6
| 11825 ||  || — || October 16, 1982 || Kleť || A. Mrkos || — || align=right | 18 km || 
|-id=826 bgcolor=#d6d6d6
| 11826 Yurijgromov ||  ||  || October 25, 1982 || Nauchnij || L. V. Zhuravleva || THM || align=right | 7.6 km || 
|-id=827 bgcolor=#fefefe
| 11827 Wasyuzan ||  ||  || November 14, 1982 || Kiso || H. Kosai, K. Furukawa || — || align=right | 4.4 km || 
|-id=828 bgcolor=#fefefe
| 11828 Vargha || 1984 DZ ||  || February 26, 1984 || La Silla || H. Debehogne || — || align=right | 4.0 km || 
|-id=829 bgcolor=#fefefe
| 11829 Tuvikene ||  ||  || March 4, 1984 || La Silla || H. Debehogne || — || align=right | 3.4 km || 
|-id=830 bgcolor=#fefefe
| 11830 Jessenius || 1984 JE ||  || May 2, 1984 || Kleť || A. Mrkos || — || align=right | 3.5 km || 
|-id=831 bgcolor=#E9E9E9
| 11831 ||  || — || September 28, 1984 || Anderson Mesa || B. A. Skiff || — || align=right | 11 km || 
|-id=832 bgcolor=#fefefe
| 11832 Pustylnik ||  ||  || September 21, 1984 || La Silla || H. Debehogne || NYS || align=right | 3.6 km || 
|-id=833 bgcolor=#fefefe
| 11833 Dixon || 1985 RW ||  || September 13, 1985 || Kitt Peak || Spacewatch || H || align=right | 1.8 km || 
|-id=834 bgcolor=#E9E9E9
| 11834 ||  || — || September 7, 1985 || La Silla || H. Debehogne || — || align=right | 6.8 km || 
|-id=835 bgcolor=#E9E9E9
| 11835 ||  || — || September 10, 1985 || La Silla || H. Debehogne || — || align=right | 7.2 km || 
|-id=836 bgcolor=#FA8072
| 11836 Eileen || 1986 CB ||  || February 5, 1986 || Palomar || C. S. Shoemaker, E. M. Shoemaker || — || align=right | 5.4 km || 
|-id=837 bgcolor=#fefefe
| 11837 || 1986 GD || — || April 2, 1986 || Brorfelde || P. Jensen || — || align=right | 4.8 km || 
|-id=838 bgcolor=#E9E9E9
| 11838 ||  || — || August 1, 1986 || Palomar || E. F. Helin || — || align=right | 3.2 km || 
|-id=839 bgcolor=#fefefe
| 11839 ||  || — || August 27, 1986 || La Silla || H. Debehogne || — || align=right | 4.1 km || 
|-id=840 bgcolor=#E9E9E9
| 11840 ||  || — || August 28, 1986 || La Silla || H. Debehogne || — || align=right | 8.7 km || 
|-id=841 bgcolor=#fefefe
| 11841 || 1986 VW || — || November 3, 1986 || Kleť || A. Mrkos || FLO || align=right | 3.3 km || 
|-id=842 bgcolor=#fefefe
| 11842 Kap'bos ||  ||  || January 22, 1987 || La Silla || E. W. Elst || FLO || align=right | 3.6 km || 
|-id=843 bgcolor=#fefefe
| 11843 ||  || — || February 23, 1987 || La Silla || H. Debehogne || — || align=right | 3.2 km || 
|-id=844 bgcolor=#d6d6d6
| 11844 Ostwald ||  ||  || August 22, 1987 || La Silla || E. W. Elst || THM || align=right | 11 km || 
|-id=845 bgcolor=#d6d6d6
| 11845 || 1987 RZ || — || September 12, 1987 || La Silla || H. Debehogne || THM || align=right | 10 km || 
|-id=846 bgcolor=#E9E9E9
| 11846 Verminnen ||  ||  || September 21, 1987 || Smolyan || E. W. Elst || — || align=right | 4.1 km || 
|-id=847 bgcolor=#E9E9E9
| 11847 Winckelmann ||  ||  || January 20, 1988 || Tautenburg Observatory || F. Börngen || — || align=right | 9.9 km || 
|-id=848 bgcolor=#E9E9E9
| 11848 Paullouka ||  ||  || February 11, 1988 || La Silla || E. W. Elst || — || align=right | 7.5 km || 
|-id=849 bgcolor=#E9E9E9
| 11849 Fauvel ||  ||  || February 15, 1988 || La Silla || E. W. Elst || — || align=right | 4.8 km || 
|-id=850 bgcolor=#E9E9E9
| 11850 ||  || — || March 13, 1988 || Brorfelde || P. Jensen || EUN || align=right | 5.1 km || 
|-id=851 bgcolor=#fefefe
| 11851 ||  || — || August 14, 1988 || Palomar || Palomar Obs. || PHO || align=right | 4.0 km || 
|-id=852 bgcolor=#fefefe
| 11852 Shoumen || 1988 RD ||  || September 10, 1988 || Smolyan || V. G. Shkodrov, V. G. Ivanova || PHO || align=right | 6.7 km || 
|-id=853 bgcolor=#fefefe
| 11853 Runge ||  ||  || September 7, 1988 || Tautenburg Observatory || F. Börngen || — || align=right | 3.9 km || 
|-id=854 bgcolor=#fefefe
| 11854 Ludwigrichter ||  ||  || September 8, 1988 || Tautenburg Observatory || F. Börngen || — || align=right | 3.6 km || 
|-id=855 bgcolor=#fefefe
| 11855 Preller ||  ||  || September 8, 1988 || Tautenburg Observatory || F. Börngen || NYS || align=right | 2.4 km || 
|-id=856 bgcolor=#fefefe
| 11856 Nicolabonev ||  ||  || September 11, 1988 || Smolyan || V. G. Ivanova, V. G. Shkodrov || — || align=right | 4.6 km || 
|-id=857 bgcolor=#d6d6d6
| 11857 ||  || — || September 1, 1988 || La Silla || H. Debehogne || — || align=right | 15 km || 
|-id=858 bgcolor=#d6d6d6
| 11858 Devinpoland ||  ||  || September 14, 1988 || Cerro Tololo || S. J. Bus || THM || align=right | 10 km || 
|-id=859 bgcolor=#fefefe
| 11859 Danngarcia ||  ||  || September 16, 1988 || Cerro Tololo || S. J. Bus || — || align=right | 3.3 km || 
|-id=860 bgcolor=#d6d6d6
| 11860 Uedasatoshi || 1988 UP ||  || October 16, 1988 || Kitami || K. Endate, K. Watanabe || THM || align=right | 12 km || 
|-id=861 bgcolor=#d6d6d6
| 11861 Teruhime ||  ||  || November 10, 1988 || Chiyoda || T. Kojima || — || align=right | 12 km || 
|-id=862 bgcolor=#fefefe
| 11862 ||  || — || December 7, 1988 || Gekko || Y. Oshima || NYS || align=right | 3.6 km || 
|-id=863 bgcolor=#E9E9E9
| 11863 || 1989 EX || — || March 8, 1989 || Okutama || T. Hioki, N. Kawasato || — || align=right | 6.1 km || 
|-id=864 bgcolor=#fefefe
| 11864 ||  || — || July 10, 1989 || Palomar || K. W. Zeigler || FLO || align=right | 4.0 km || 
|-id=865 bgcolor=#fefefe
| 11865 || 1989 SC || — || September 23, 1989 || Kani || Y. Mizuno, T. Furuta || — || align=right | 2.6 km || 
|-id=866 bgcolor=#d6d6d6
| 11866 ||  || — || September 30, 1989 || La Silla || H. Debehogne || — || align=right | 3.8 km || 
|-id=867 bgcolor=#fefefe
| 11867 || 1989 TW || — || October 4, 1989 || Toyota || K. Suzuki, T. Furuta || FLO || align=right | 3.1 km || 
|-id=868 bgcolor=#d6d6d6
| 11868 Kleinrichert || 1989 TY ||  || October 2, 1989 || McGraw-Hill || R. P. Binzel || — || align=right | 6.1 km || 
|-id=869 bgcolor=#C2FFFF
| 11869 ||  || — || October 3, 1989 || Cerro Tololo || S. J. Bus || L5 || align=right | 27 km || 
|-id=870 bgcolor=#d6d6d6
| 11870 Sverige ||  ||  || October 7, 1989 || La Silla || E. W. Elst || — || align=right | 7.0 km || 
|-id=871 bgcolor=#fefefe
| 11871 Norge ||  ||  || October 7, 1989 || La Silla || E. W. Elst || FLO || align=right | 2.5 km || 
|-id=872 bgcolor=#fefefe
| 11872 || 1989 WR || — || November 20, 1989 || Kushiro || S. Ueda, H. Kaneda || FLO || align=right | 3.3 km || 
|-id=873 bgcolor=#fefefe
| 11873 Kokuseibi ||  ||  || November 30, 1989 || Kushiro || M. Matsuyama, K. Watanabe || — || align=right | 5.2 km || 
|-id=874 bgcolor=#fefefe
| 11874 Gringauz ||  ||  || December 2, 1989 || La Silla || E. W. Elst || FLO || align=right | 3.1 km || 
|-id=875 bgcolor=#d6d6d6
| 11875 Rhône ||  ||  || December 28, 1989 || Haute-Provence || E. W. Elst || MEL || align=right | 22 km || 
|-id=876 bgcolor=#fefefe
| 11876 Doncarpenter ||  ||  || March 2, 1990 || La Silla || E. W. Elst || V || align=right | 3.2 km || 
|-id=877 bgcolor=#fefefe
| 11877 ||  || — || March 5, 1990 || La Silla || H. Debehogne || — || align=right | 5.0 km || 
|-id=878 bgcolor=#fefefe
| 11878 Hanamiyama || 1990 HJ ||  || April 18, 1990 || Geisei || T. Seki || — || align=right | 3.5 km || 
|-id=879 bgcolor=#E9E9E9
| 11879 ||  || — || August 22, 1990 || Palomar || H. E. Holt || AST || align=right | 8.2 km || 
|-id=880 bgcolor=#E9E9E9
| 11880 ||  || — || August 24, 1990 || Palomar || H. E. Holt || — || align=right | 8.6 km || 
|-id=881 bgcolor=#E9E9E9
| 11881 Mirstation ||  ||  || August 20, 1990 || La Silla || E. W. Elst || EUN || align=right | 4.0 km || 
|-id=882 bgcolor=#E9E9E9
| 11882 ||  || — || September 14, 1990 || Palomar || H. E. Holt || HEN || align=right | 3.3 km || 
|-id=883 bgcolor=#E9E9E9
| 11883 ||  || — || September 15, 1990 || Palomar || H. E. Holt || PAD || align=right | 9.0 km || 
|-id=884 bgcolor=#E9E9E9
| 11884 ||  || — || September 8, 1990 || La Silla || H. Debehogne || EUN || align=right | 7.1 km || 
|-id=885 bgcolor=#FFC2E0
| 11885 Summanus || 1990 SS ||  || September 25, 1990 || Kitt Peak || Spacewatch || APO || align=right | 1.3 km || 
|-id=886 bgcolor=#E9E9E9
| 11886 Kraske ||  ||  || October 10, 1990 || Tautenburg Observatory || L. D. Schmadel, F. Börngen || — || align=right | 6.7 km || 
|-id=887 bgcolor=#C2FFFF
| 11887 Echemmon ||  ||  || October 14, 1990 || Tautenburg Observatory || F. Börngen, L. D. Schmadel || L5 || align=right | 31 km || 
|-id=888 bgcolor=#E9E9E9
| 11888 ||  || — || October 19, 1990 || Dynic || A. Sugie || CLO || align=right | 7.9 km || 
|-id=889 bgcolor=#E9E9E9
| 11889 ||  || — || January 7, 1991 || Siding Spring || R. H. McNaught || — || align=right | 10 km || 
|-id=890 bgcolor=#d6d6d6
| 11890 || 1991 FF || — || March 18, 1991 || Siding Spring || R. H. McNaught || — || align=right | 8.7 km || 
|-id=891 bgcolor=#fefefe
| 11891 ||  || — || March 20, 1991 || La Silla || H. Debehogne || — || align=right | 3.3 km || 
|-id=892 bgcolor=#fefefe
| 11892 ||  || — || March 20, 1991 || La Silla || H. Debehogne || — || align=right | 2.8 km || 
|-id=893 bgcolor=#d6d6d6
| 11893 ||  || — || March 20, 1991 || La Silla || H. Debehogne || — || align=right | 11 km || 
|-id=894 bgcolor=#fefefe
| 11894 || 1991 GW || — || April 3, 1991 || Uenohara || N. Kawasato || — || align=right | 7.3 km || 
|-id=895 bgcolor=#fefefe
| 11895 Dehant ||  ||  || April 8, 1991 || La Silla || E. W. Elst || — || align=right | 4.0 km || 
|-id=896 bgcolor=#fefefe
| 11896 Camelbeeck ||  ||  || April 8, 1991 || La Silla || E. W. Elst || NYS || align=right | 2.0 km || 
|-id=897 bgcolor=#fefefe
| 11897 Lemaire ||  ||  || April 8, 1991 || La Silla || E. W. Elst || — || align=right | 3.6 km || 
|-id=898 bgcolor=#d6d6d6
| 11898 Dedeyn ||  ||  || April 10, 1991 || La Silla || E. W. Elst || THM || align=right | 11 km || 
|-id=899 bgcolor=#d6d6d6
| 11899 Weill ||  ||  || April 9, 1991 || Tautenburg Observatory || F. Börngen || VER || align=right | 13 km || 
|-id=900 bgcolor=#fefefe
| 11900 Spinoy ||  ||  || June 6, 1991 || La Silla || E. W. Elst || NYS || align=right | 2.9 km || 
|}

11901–12000 

|-bgcolor=#fefefe
| 11901 ||  || — || August 7, 1991 || Palomar || H. E. Holt || — || align=right | 5.3 km || 
|-id=902 bgcolor=#fefefe
| 11902 ||  || — || August 5, 1991 || Palomar || H. E. Holt || V || align=right | 3.5 km || 
|-id=903 bgcolor=#E9E9E9
| 11903 ||  || — || September 2, 1991 || Siding Spring || R. H. McNaught || — || align=right | 6.8 km || 
|-id=904 bgcolor=#fefefe
| 11904 ||  || — || October 13, 1991 || Palomar || K. J. Lawrence || H || align=right | 2.2 km || 
|-id=905 bgcolor=#E9E9E9
| 11905 Giacometti ||  ||  || November 6, 1991 || La Silla || E. W. Elst || EUN || align=right | 4.1 km || 
|-id=906 bgcolor=#E9E9E9
| 11906 ||  || — || January 10, 1992 || Okutama || T. Hioki, S. Hayakawa || — || align=right | 5.3 km || 
|-id=907 bgcolor=#d6d6d6
| 11907 Näränen ||  ||  || March 2, 1992 || La Silla || UESAC || KOR || align=right | 5.4 km || 
|-id=908 bgcolor=#d6d6d6
| 11908 Nicaragua ||  ||  || April 4, 1992 || La Silla || E. W. Elst || — || align=right | 8.8 km || 
|-id=909 bgcolor=#d6d6d6
| 11909 ||  || — || April 25, 1992 || La Silla || H. Debehogne || — || align=right | 17 km || 
|-id=910 bgcolor=#fefefe
| 11910 || 1992 KJ || — || May 28, 1992 || Kiyosato || S. Otomo || — || align=right | 3.7 km || 
|-id=911 bgcolor=#d6d6d6
| 11911 Angel || 1992 LF ||  || June 4, 1992 || Palomar || C. S. Shoemaker, D. H. Levy || LUT || align=right | 27 km || 
|-id=912 bgcolor=#fefefe
| 11912 Piedade ||  ||  || July 30, 1992 || La Silla || E. W. Elst || — || align=right | 4.1 km || 
|-id=913 bgcolor=#fefefe
| 11913 Svarna ||  ||  || September 2, 1992 || La Silla || E. W. Elst || FLO || align=right | 2.4 km || 
|-id=914 bgcolor=#fefefe
| 11914 Sinachopoulos ||  ||  || September 2, 1992 || La Silla || E. W. Elst || — || align=right | 2.6 km || 
|-id=915 bgcolor=#fefefe
| 11915 Nishiinoue ||  ||  || September 23, 1992 || Kitami || K. Endate, K. Watanabe || — || align=right | 3.1 km || 
|-id=916 bgcolor=#fefefe
| 11916 Wiesloch ||  ||  || September 24, 1992 || Tautenburg Observatory || L. D. Schmadel, F. Börngen || V || align=right | 4.4 km || 
|-id=917 bgcolor=#fefefe
| 11917 || 1992 UX || — || October 21, 1992 || Oohira || T. Urata || V || align=right | 3.7 km || 
|-id=918 bgcolor=#fefefe
| 11918 || 1992 UY || — || October 21, 1992 || Oohira || T. Urata || — || align=right | 3.1 km || 
|-id=919 bgcolor=#fefefe
| 11919 ||  || — || October 25, 1992 || Yakiimo || A. Natori, T. Urata || PHO || align=right | 3.3 km || 
|-id=920 bgcolor=#fefefe
| 11920 ||  || — || October 25, 1992 || Uenohara || N. Kawasato || — || align=right | 3.5 km || 
|-id=921 bgcolor=#E9E9E9
| 11921 Mitamasahiro ||  ||  || October 26, 1992 || Kitami || K. Endate, K. Watanabe || — || align=right | 14 km || 
|-id=922 bgcolor=#fefefe
| 11922 ||  || — || October 27, 1992 || Oohira || T. Urata || FLO || align=right | 3.6 km || 
|-id=923 bgcolor=#fefefe
| 11923 || 1992 WX || — || November 17, 1992 || Dynic || A. Sugie || — || align=right | 2.8 km || 
|-id=924 bgcolor=#fefefe
| 11924 ||  || — || November 17, 1992 || Kani || Y. Mizuno, T. Furuta || — || align=right | 3.7 km || 
|-id=925 bgcolor=#fefefe
| 11925 Usubae ||  ||  || December 23, 1992 || Geisei || T. Seki || NYS || align=right | 2.1 km || 
|-id=926 bgcolor=#fefefe
| 11926 Orinoco ||  ||  || December 18, 1992 || Caussols || E. W. Elst || — || align=right | 4.6 km || 
|-id=927 bgcolor=#E9E9E9
| 11927 Mount Kent || 1993 BA ||  || January 16, 1993 || Geisei || T. Seki || — || align=right | 8.2 km || 
|-id=928 bgcolor=#E9E9E9
| 11928 Akimotohiro ||  ||  || January 23, 1993 || Kitami || K. Endate, K. Watanabe || — || align=right | 8.0 km || 
|-id=929 bgcolor=#E9E9E9
| 11929 Uchino ||  ||  || January 23, 1993 || Kitami || K. Endate, K. Watanabe || — || align=right | 9.6 km || 
|-id=930 bgcolor=#E9E9E9
| 11930 Osamu ||  ||  || February 15, 1993 || Okutama || T. Hioki, S. Hayakawa || EUN || align=right | 4.3 km || 
|-id=931 bgcolor=#E9E9E9
| 11931 ||  || — || February 22, 1993 || Oohira || T. Urata || MAR || align=right | 6.6 km || 
|-id=932 bgcolor=#E9E9E9
| 11932 || 1993 EP || — || March 13, 1993 || Fujieda || H. Shiozawa, T. Urata || — || align=right | 6.8 km || 
|-id=933 bgcolor=#E9E9E9
| 11933 Himuka || 1993 ES ||  || March 15, 1993 || Kitami || K. Endate, K. Watanabe || — || align=right | 9.2 km || 
|-id=934 bgcolor=#E9E9E9
| 11934 Lundgren ||  ||  || March 17, 1993 || La Silla || UESAC || — || align=right | 4.5 km || 
|-id=935 bgcolor=#E9E9E9
| 11935 Olakarlsson ||  ||  || March 17, 1993 || La Silla || UESAC || — || align=right | 4.9 km || 
|-id=936 bgcolor=#E9E9E9
| 11936 Tremolizzo ||  ||  || March 17, 1993 || La Silla || UESAC || — || align=right | 5.3 km || 
|-id=937 bgcolor=#E9E9E9
| 11937 ||  || — || March 17, 1993 || La Silla || UESAC || NEM || align=right | 6.9 km || 
|-id=938 bgcolor=#E9E9E9
| 11938 ||  || — || March 21, 1993 || La Silla || UESAC || HOF || align=right | 8.0 km || 
|-id=939 bgcolor=#E9E9E9
| 11939 ||  || — || March 19, 1993 || La Silla || UESAC || KON || align=right | 13 km || 
|-id=940 bgcolor=#E9E9E9
| 11940 || 1993 GR || — || April 15, 1993 || Kushiro || S. Ueda, H. Kaneda || — || align=right | 11 km || 
|-id=941 bgcolor=#fefefe
| 11941 Archinal ||  ||  || May 23, 1993 || Palomar || C. S. Shoemaker, D. H. Levy || H || align=right | 4.8 km || 
|-id=942 bgcolor=#d6d6d6
| 11942 Guettard || 1993 NV ||  || July 12, 1993 || La Silla || E. W. Elst || — || align=right | 4.3 km || 
|-id=943 bgcolor=#d6d6d6
| 11943 Davidhartley ||  ||  || July 20, 1993 || La Silla || E. W. Elst || EOS || align=right | 12 km || 
|-id=944 bgcolor=#d6d6d6
| 11944 Shaftesbury ||  ||  || July 20, 1993 || La Silla || E. W. Elst || KOR || align=right | 6.9 km || 
|-id=945 bgcolor=#d6d6d6
| 11945 Amsterdam ||  ||  || August 15, 1993 || Caussols || E. W. Elst || — || align=right | 12 km || 
|-id=946 bgcolor=#d6d6d6
| 11946 Bayle ||  ||  || August 15, 1993 || Caussols || E. W. Elst || THM || align=right | 14 km || 
|-id=947 bgcolor=#d6d6d6
| 11947 Kimclijsters ||  ||  || August 15, 1993 || Caussols || E. W. Elst || — || align=right | 8.7 km || 
|-id=948 bgcolor=#d6d6d6
| 11948 Justinehénin ||  ||  || August 18, 1993 || Caussols || E. W. Elst || THM || align=right | 11 km || 
|-id=949 bgcolor=#d6d6d6
| 11949 Kagayayutaka ||  ||  || September 19, 1993 || Kitami || K. Endate, K. Watanabe || — || align=right | 6.9 km || 
|-id=950 bgcolor=#d6d6d6
| 11950 Morellet ||  ||  || September 19, 1993 || Caussols || E. W. Elst || THM || align=right | 11 km || 
|-id=951 bgcolor=#d6d6d6
| 11951 ||  || — || January 12, 1994 || Farra d'Isonzo || Farra d'Isonzo || 3:2 || align=right | 15 km || 
|-id=952 bgcolor=#fefefe
| 11952 ||  || — || January 8, 1994 || Fujieda || H. Shiozawa, T. Urata || FLO || align=right | 4.2 km || 
|-id=953 bgcolor=#fefefe
| 11953 || 1994 BW || — || January 19, 1994 || Ōizumi || T. Kobayashi || V || align=right | 2.1 km || 
|-id=954 bgcolor=#fefefe
| 11954 || 1994 BY || — || January 22, 1994 || Fujieda || H. Shiozawa, T. Urata || — || align=right | 3.4 km || 
|-id=955 bgcolor=#fefefe
| 11955 Russrobb ||  ||  || February 8, 1994 || NRC-DAO || D. D. Balam || — || align=right | 3.3 km || 
|-id=956 bgcolor=#fefefe
| 11956 Tamarakate ||  ||  || February 8, 1994 || La Silla || E. W. Elst || — || align=right | 3.4 km || 
|-id=957 bgcolor=#fefefe
| 11957 || 1994 DS || — || February 17, 1994 || Ōizumi || T. Kobayashi || FLO || align=right | 3.2 km || 
|-id=958 bgcolor=#fefefe
| 11958 Galiani ||  ||  || March 9, 1994 || Caussols || E. W. Elst || — || align=right | 4.4 km || 
|-id=959 bgcolor=#E9E9E9
| 11959 Okunokeno ||  ||  || April 13, 1994 || Kitami || K. Endate, K. Watanabe || — || align=right | 6.7 km || 
|-id=960 bgcolor=#E9E9E9
| 11960 || 1994 HA || — || April 17, 1994 || Ōizumi || T. Kobayashi || — || align=right | 4.3 km || 
|-id=961 bgcolor=#E9E9E9
| 11961 || 1994 PO || — || August 3, 1994 || Nachi-Katsuura || Y. Shimizu, T. Urata || EUN || align=right | 7.2 km || 
|-id=962 bgcolor=#E9E9E9
| 11962 || 1994 PX || — || August 14, 1994 || Ōizumi || T. Kobayashi || — || align=right | 7.8 km || 
|-id=963 bgcolor=#E9E9E9
| 11963 Ignace ||  ||  || August 10, 1994 || La Silla || E. W. Elst || — || align=right | 8.3 km || 
|-id=964 bgcolor=#d6d6d6
| 11964 Prigogine ||  ||  || August 10, 1994 || La Silla || E. W. Elst || KOR || align=right | 4.4 km || 
|-id=965 bgcolor=#d6d6d6
| 11965 Catullus ||  ||  || August 12, 1994 || La Silla || E. W. Elst || — || align=right | 8.4 km || 
|-id=966 bgcolor=#d6d6d6
| 11966 Plateau ||  ||  || August 12, 1994 || La Silla || E. W. Elst || KOR || align=right | 5.2 km || 
|-id=967 bgcolor=#E9E9E9
| 11967 Boyle ||  ||  || August 12, 1994 || La Silla || E. W. Elst || — || align=right | 4.8 km || 
|-id=968 bgcolor=#E9E9E9
| 11968 Demariotte ||  ||  || August 12, 1994 || La Silla || E. W. Elst || NEM || align=right | 9.1 km || 
|-id=969 bgcolor=#E9E9E9
| 11969 Gay-Lussac ||  ||  || August 10, 1994 || La Silla || E. W. Elst || AGN || align=right | 4.3 km || 
|-id=970 bgcolor=#d6d6d6
| 11970 Palitzsch || 1994 TD ||  || October 4, 1994 || Sormano || P. Sicoli, P. Ghezzi || — || align=right | 9.4 km || 
|-id=971 bgcolor=#d6d6d6
| 11971 ||  || — || October 31, 1994 || Kushiro || S. Ueda, H. Kaneda || — || align=right | 11 km || 
|-id=972 bgcolor=#d6d6d6
| 11972 || 1994 VK || — || November 1, 1994 || Ōizumi || T. Kobayashi || HYG || align=right | 8.6 km || 
|-id=973 bgcolor=#d6d6d6
| 11973 || 1994 VN || — || November 1, 1994 || Ōizumi || T. Kobayashi || — || align=right | 8.1 km || 
|-id=974 bgcolor=#d6d6d6
| 11974 Yasuhidefujita || 1994 YF ||  || December 24, 1994 || Ōizumi || T. Kobayashi || THM || align=right | 10 km || 
|-id=975 bgcolor=#fefefe
| 11975 ||  || — || March 31, 1995 || La Silla || S. Mottola, E. Koldewey || — || align=right | 2.3 km || 
|-id=976 bgcolor=#fefefe
| 11976 Josephthurn || 1995 JG ||  || May 5, 1995 || Farra d'Isonzo || Farra d'Isonzo || H || align=right | 8.4 km || 
|-id=977 bgcolor=#fefefe
| 11977 Leonrisoldi || 1995 OA ||  || July 19, 1995 || Stroncone || Santa Lucia Obs. || V || align=right | 6.6 km || 
|-id=978 bgcolor=#E9E9E9
| 11978 Makotomasako ||  ||  || September 20, 1995 || Kitami || K. Endate, K. Watanabe || — || align=right | 8.7 km || 
|-id=979 bgcolor=#E9E9E9
| 11979 ||  || — || September 25, 1995 || Xinglong || SCAP || — || align=right | 2.4 km || 
|-id=980 bgcolor=#fefefe
| 11980 Ellis ||  ||  || September 17, 1995 || Kitt Peak || Spacewatch || V || align=right | 2.4 km || 
|-id=981 bgcolor=#E9E9E9
| 11981 Boncompagni ||  ||  || October 20, 1995 || Bologna || San Vittore Obs. || — || align=right | 4.8 km || 
|-id=982 bgcolor=#E9E9E9
| 11982 ||  || — || October 25, 1995 || Nachi-Katsuura || Y. Shimizu, T. Urata || — || align=right | 4.7 km || 
|-id=983 bgcolor=#E9E9E9
| 11983 ||  || — || October 27, 1995 || Ōizumi || T. Kobayashi || WIT || align=right | 4.4 km || 
|-id=984 bgcolor=#E9E9E9
| 11984 Manet ||  ||  || October 20, 1995 || Caussols || E. W. Elst || — || align=right | 5.7 km || 
|-id=985 bgcolor=#E9E9E9
| 11985 || 1995 VG || — || November 1, 1995 || Ōizumi || T. Kobayashi || HEN || align=right | 7.6 km || 
|-id=986 bgcolor=#E9E9E9
| 11986 || 1995 VP || — || November 3, 1995 || Ōizumi || T. Kobayashi || — || align=right | 7.2 km || 
|-id=987 bgcolor=#E9E9E9
| 11987 Yonematsu ||  ||  || November 15, 1995 || Kitami || K. Endate, K. Watanabe || — || align=right | 14 km || 
|-id=988 bgcolor=#E9E9E9
| 11988 || 1995 WB || — || November 16, 1995 || Ōizumi || T. Kobayashi || — || align=right | 4.8 km || 
|-id=989 bgcolor=#E9E9E9
| 11989 ||  || — || November 24, 1995 || Ōizumi || T. Kobayashi || PAD || align=right | 12 km || 
|-id=990 bgcolor=#E9E9E9
| 11990 ||  || — || November 21, 1995 || Kushiro || S. Ueda, H. Kaneda || VIB || align=right | 10 km || 
|-id=991 bgcolor=#E9E9E9
| 11991 ||  || — || November 27, 1995 || Ōizumi || T. Kobayashi || PAD || align=right | 8.4 km || 
|-id=992 bgcolor=#E9E9E9
| 11992 || 1995 XH || — || December 2, 1995 || Ōizumi || T. Kobayashi || AGN || align=right | 4.5 km || 
|-id=993 bgcolor=#d6d6d6
| 11993 || 1995 XX || — || December 8, 1995 || Haleakalā || AMOS || EOS || align=right | 8.5 km || 
|-id=994 bgcolor=#d6d6d6
| 11994 || 1995 YP || — || December 19, 1995 || Ōizumi || T. Kobayashi || KOR || align=right | 5.9 km || 
|-id=995 bgcolor=#d6d6d6
| 11995 ||  || — || December 21, 1995 || Ōizumi || T. Kobayashi || HYG || align=right | 13 km || 
|-id=996 bgcolor=#d6d6d6
| 11996 ||  || — || December 21, 1995 || Ōizumi || T. Kobayashi || — || align=right | 6.0 km || 
|-id=997 bgcolor=#d6d6d6
| 11997 Fassel ||  ||  || December 18, 1995 || Kitt Peak || Spacewatch || — || align=right | 8.6 km || 
|-id=998 bgcolor=#d6d6d6
| 11998 Fermilab ||  ||  || January 12, 1996 || Kitt Peak || Spacewatch || — || align=right | 7.7 km || 
|-id=999 bgcolor=#E9E9E9
| 11999 ||  || — || January 23, 1996 || Ōizumi || T. Kobayashi || — || align=right | 6.3 km || 
|-id=000 bgcolor=#d6d6d6
| 12000 ||  || — || February 12, 1996 || Kushiro || S. Ueda, H. Kaneda || — || align=right | 15 km || 
|}

References

External links 
 Discovery Circumstances: Numbered Minor Planets (10001)–(15000) (IAU Minor Planet Center)

0011